

Alpine skiing

FIS World Championships (AS)
 February 5 – 17: FIS Alpine World Ski Championships 2019 in  Åre
 Alpine Combined winners:  Alexis Pinturault (m) /  Wendy Holdener (f)
 Downhill winners:  Kjetil Jansrud (m) /  Ilka Štuhec (f)
 Giant Slalom winners:  Henrik Kristoffersen (m) /  Petra Vlhová (f)
 Slalom winners:  Marcel Hirscher (m) /  Mikaela Shiffrin (f)
 Super G winners:  Dominik Paris (m) /  Mikaela Shiffrin (f)
 Alpine Team Event winners:  (Aline Danioth, Wendy Holdener, Daniel Yule, & Ramon Zenhäusern)
 February 18 – 27: World Junior Alpine Skiing Championships 2019 in  Fassa Valley
 Junior Giant Slalom winners:  River Radamus (m) /  Alice Robinson (f)
 Junior Slalom winners:  Alex Vinatzer (m) /  Meta Hrovat (f)
 Junior Downhill winners:  Lars Roesti (m) /  Juliana Suter (f)
 Junior Super G winners:  River Radamus (m) /  Hannah Saethereng (f)
 Junior Alpine Combined winners:  Tobias Hedstroem (m) /  Nicole Good (f)
 Junior Mixed Alpine Team Event winners:  (Marie Lamure, Jeremie Lagier, Doriane Escane, & Augustin Bianchini)

2018–19 FIS Alpine Ski World Cup
 Note: For the FIS page about these events, click here.
 October 2018
 October 27 & 28: ASWC #1 in  Sölden
 Note: The men's giant slalom event was cancelled, due to huge amounts of snow.
 Women's Giant Slalom winner:  Tessa Worley
 November 2018
 November 17 & 18: ASWC #2 in  Levi
 Slalom winners:  Marcel Hirscher (m) /  Mikaela Shiffrin (f)
 November 21 – 25: ASWC #3 in  Lake Louise Ski Resort #1 
 Men's Downhill winner:  Max Franz
 Men's Super G winner:  Kjetil Jansrud
 November 24 & 25: ASWC #4 in  Killington Ski Resort
 Women's Giant Slalom winner:  Federica Brignone
 Women's Slalom winner:  Mikaela Shiffrin
 November 27 – December 2: ASWC #5 in  Lake Louise Ski Resort #2
 Women's Downhill winner:  Nicole Schmidhofer (2 times)
 Women's Super G winner:  Mikaela Shiffrin
 November 27 – December 2: ASWC #6 in  Beaver Creek Resort
 Men's Super G winner:  Max Franz 
 Men's Downhill winner:  Beat Feuz
 Men's Giant Slalom winner:  Stefan Luitz
 December 2018
 December 8 & 9: ASWC #8 in  Val-d'Isère #1
 Note: The men's slalom event was cancelled.
 Men's Giant Slalom winner:  Marcel Hirscher
 December 8 & 9: ASWC #7 in  St. Moritz
 Women's Super G & Parallel Slalom winner:  Mikaela Shiffrin
 December 12 – 15: ASWC #9 in  Val Gardena #1
 Men's Super G winner:  Aksel Lund Svindal
 Men's Downhill winner:  Aleksander Aamodt Kilde
 December 16 & 17: ASWC #10 in  Alta Badia
 Men's Giant Slalom & Parallel Giant Slalom winner:  Marcel Hirscher
 December 17 – 20: ASWC #11 in  Val Gardena #2
 Note: The women's alpine combined event was cancelled.
 Women's Downhill & Super G winner:  Ilka Štuhec
 December 19 & 20: ASWC #12 in  Saalbach-Hinterglemm
 Men's Giant Slalom winner:  Žan Kranjec
 Men's Slalom winner:  Marcel Hirscher
 December 21 & 22: ASWC #13 in  Courchevel
 Women's Giant Slalom & Slalom winner:  Mikaela Shiffrin
 December 22: ASWC #14 in  Madonna di Campiglio
 Men's Slalom winner:  Daniel Yule
 December 26 – 29: ASWC #15 in  Bormio
 Men's Downhill & Super G winner:  Dominik Paris
 December 28 & 29: ASWC #16 in  Semmering
 Women's Giant Slalom winner:  Petra Vlhová
 Women's Slalom winner:  Mikaela Shiffrin
 January 2019
 January 1: ASWC #17 in  Oslo
 City Event winners:  Marco Schwarz (m) /  Petra Vlhová (f)
 January 5 & 6: ASWC #18 in  Zagreb
 Slalom winners:  Marcel Hirscher (m) /  Mikaela Shiffrin (f)
 January 8: ASWC #19 in  Flachau
 Women's Slalom winner:  Petra Vlhová
 January 10 – 13: ASWC #20 in  St Anton am Arlberg
 Event cancelled.
 January 12 & 13: ASWC #21 in  Adelboden
 Men's Giant Slalom & Slalom winner:  Marcel Hirscher
 January 15: ASWC #22 in  Kronplatz
 Women's Giant Slalom winner:  Mikaela Shiffrin
 January 15 – 20: ASWC #23 in  Wengen
 Men's Alpine Combined winner:  Marco Schwarz
 Men's Downhill winner:  Vincent Kriechmayr
 Men's Slalom winner:  Clément Noël
 January 17 – 20: ASWC #24 in  Cortina d'Ampezzo
 Women's Downhill winner:  Ramona Siebenhofer (2 times)
 Women's Super G winner:  Mikaela Shiffrin
 January 22 – 27: ASWC #25 in  Kitzbühel
 Men's Downhill winner:  Dominik Paris
 Men's Slalom winner:  Clément Noël
 Men's Super G winner:  Josef Ferstl
 January 24 – 27: ASWC #26 in  Garmisch-Partenkirchen #1
 Women's Super G winner:  Nicole Schmidhofer
 Women's Downhill winner:  Stephanie Venier
 January 29: ASWC #27 in  Schladming
 Men's Slalom winner:  Marcel Hirscher
 January 31 – February 3: ASWC #28 in  Garmisch-Partenkirchen #2
 Event cancelled.
 February 2019
 February 1 & 2: ASWC #29 in  Maribor
 Women's Giant Slalom winner:  Petra Vlhová
 Women's Slalom winner:  Mikaela Shiffrin
 February 19: ASWC #30 in  Stockholm
 City Event winners:  Ramon Zenhäusern (m) /  Mikaela Shiffrin (f)
 February 21 – 24: ASWC #31 in  Crans-Montana
 Women's Downhill winner:  Sofia Goggia
 Women's Alpine Combined winner:  Federica Brignone
 February 22 – 24: ASWC #32 in  Bansko
 Note: The men's super G event here was cancelled.
 Men's Alpine Combined winner:  Alexis Pinturault
 Men's Giant Slalom winner:  Henrik Kristoffersen
 February 27 – March 3: ASWC #33 in  Rosa Khutor Alpine Resort
 Event cancelled.
 February 28 – March 3: ASWC #34 in  Kvitfjell
 Note: The second men's downhill event here was cancelled.
 Men's Downhill & Super G winner:  Dominik Paris
 March 2019
 March 8 & 9: ASWC #35 in  Špindlerův Mlýn
 Women's Giant Slalom winner:  Petra Vlhová
 Women's Slalom winner:  Mikaela Shiffrin
 March 9 & 10: ASWC #36 in  Kranjska Gora Ski Resort
 Men's Giant Slalom winner:  Henrik Kristoffersen
 Men's Slalom winner:  Ramon Zenhäusern
 March 11 – 17: ASWC #37 (final) in  Soldeu
 Downhill winners:  Dominik Paris (m) /  Mirjam Puchner (f)
 Super G winners:  Dominik Paris (m) /  Viktoria Rebensburg (f)
 Team Alpine Event winners:  (Aline Danioth, Wendy Holdener, Daniel Yule, & Ramon Zenhäusern)
 Giant Slalom winners:  Alexis Pinturault (m) /  Mikaela Shiffrin (f)
 Slalom winners:  Clément Noël (m) /  Mikaela Shiffrin (f)

2018–19 FIS Alpine Skiing European Cup
 Note: For the FIS page about these events, click here.
 November 2018
 November 29 & 30: ECAS #1 in  Levi
 Men's Slalom winners:  Sandro Simonet (#1) /  Alex Vinatzer (#2)
 November 30 & December 1: ECAS #2 in  Funäsdalen #1
 Women's Giant Slalom winners:  Kristine Gjelsten Haugen (#1) /  Julia Scheib (#2)
 December 2018
 December 3 & 4: ECAS #3 in  Trysil
 Women's Slalom winners:  Ylva Staalnacke (#1) /  Nastasia Noens (#2)
 December 4 & 5: ECAS #4 in  Funäsdalen #2
 Men's Giant Slalom winners:  Simon Maurberger (#1) /  Fabian Wilkens Solheim (#2)
 December 6 & 7: ECAS #5 in  Kvitfjell
 Women's Super G winner:  Christina Ager 
 Women's Alpine Combined winner:  Anne-Sophie Barthet
 December 11 & 12: ECAS #6 in  St. Moritz
 Note: The men's alpine combined event here was cancelled.
 Men's Super G winners:  Marco Odermatt (#1) /  Stefan Rogentin (#2)
 December 13 & 14: ECAS #7 in  Andalo-Paganella #1
 Women's Giant Slalom winner:  Maryna Gąsienica-Daniel (2 times)
 December 17 & 18: ECAS #8 in  Andalo-Paganella #2
 Men's Giant Slalom winners:  Cedric Noger (#1) /  Lucas Braathen (#2)
 December 17 – 21: ECAS #9 in  Zauchensee
 Women's Downhill winner:  Nadia Delago (2 times)
 Women's Super G winner:  Elisabeth Reisinger
 Men's Super G winners:  Gino Caviezel (#1) /  Stefan Babinsky (#2)
 December 19: ECAS #10 in  Obereggen
 Men's Slalom winner:  Istok Rodeš
 December 21 & 22: ECAS #11 in  Saalbach-Hinterglemm
 Event cancelled.
 January 2019
 January 6 & 7: ECAS #12 in  Val-Cenis
 Men's Slalom winner:  Simon Maurberger (2 times)
 January 9 – 12: ECAS #13 in  Wengen
 Note: The second men's downhill event here was cancelled.
 Men's Downhill winner:  Mattia Casse 
 January 11 & 12: ECAS #14 in  Göstling-Hochkar
 Event cancelled.
 January 14 & 15: ECAS #15 in  Reiteralm
 Event cancelled.
 January 15 – 18: ECAS #16 in  Fassa Valley
 Women's Downhill winners:  Elisabeth Reisinger (#1) /  Nadia Delago (#2)
 January 17: ECAS #17 in  Kronplatz
 Men's Giant Slalom winner:  Lucas Braathen 
 January 19 – 21: ECAS #18 in  Kitzbühel
 Men's Downhill winner:  Daniel Danklmaier 
 January 21 & 22: ECAS #19 in  Zinal
 Women's Giant Slalom winners:  Franziska Gritsch (#1) /  Ylva Staalnacke (#2)
 January 23 & 24: ECAS #20 in  Courchevel
 Men's Giant Slalom winners:  Lucas Braathen (#1) /  Stefan Brennsteiner (#2)
 January 24 & 25: ECAS #21 in  Melchsee-Frutt
 Women's Slalom winners:  Meta Hrovat (#1) /  Marlene Schmotz (#2)
 January 27 – 30: ECAS #22 in  Chamonix
 Men's Downhill winner:  Victor Schuller (2 times)
 January 28 & 29: ECAS #23 in  Les Diablerets
 Women's Alpine Combined winner:  Nicole Good 
 Women's Super G winner:  Elisabeth Reisinger (2 times)
 January 31 & February 1: ECAS #24 in  Tignes
 Women's Giant Slalom winner:  Lindy Etzensperger
 Parallel Slalom winners:  Pirmin Hacker (m) /  Marie Lamure (f) 
 February 2019
 February 4 & 5: ECAS #25 in  Gstaad-Saanenland
 Men's Slalom winners:  Istok Rodeš (#1) /  Jonathan Nordbotten (#2)
 February 4 & 5: ECAS #26 in  Obdach
 Women's Slalom winners:  Katharina Huber (#1) /  Gabriela Capová (#2)
 February 9 & 10: ECAS #27 in  Berchtesgaden
 Women's Giant Slalom winners:  Alice Robinson (#1) /  Kaja Norbye (#2)
 February 11 – 15: ECAS #28 in  Sarntal
 Men's Downhill winners:  Thomas Biesemeyer (#1) /  Christopher Neumayer (#2)
 Men's Alpine Combined winner:  Christof Brandner
 Men's Super G winner:  Davide Cazzaniga 
 February 14 – 17: ECAS #29 in  Crans-Montana
 Women's Downhill winner:  Elisabeth Reisinger (2 times)
 February 28 – March 2: ECAS #30 in  Oberjoch
 Note: Both men's slalom events here were cancelled.
 Men's Giant Slalom winner:  Andrea Ballerin
 March 2019
 March 2 & 3: ECAS #31 in  Jasná
 Women's Giant Slalom & Slalom winner:  Petra Vlhová
 March 5 – 7: ECAS #32 in  Hinterstoder
 Men's Giant Slalom winner:  Bjørnar Neteland
 March 11 & 12: ECAS #33 in  Kranjska Gora
 Men's Giant Slalom winner:  Hannes Zingerle
 Men's Slalom winner:  Jonathan Nordbotten
 March 11 – 17: ECAS #34 in  Sella Nevea
 Men's Super G winner:  Roy Piccard (2 times)
 Women's Super G winner:  Roberta Melesi 
 Downhill winners:  Urs Kryenbühl (m) /  Priska Nufer (f)
 Men's Alpine Combined winner:  Simon Maurberger
 March 16 & 17: ECAS #35 (final) in  Folgaria
 Women's Giant Slalom winner:  Julia Scheib
 Women's Slalom winner:  Charlie Guest

2018–19 FIS Alpine Skiing Nor-Am Cup
 Note: For the FIS page about these events, click here.
 December 3 – 7, 2018: SNAC #1 in  Lake Louise Ski Resort
 Note: The alpine combined events here were cancelled.
 Men's Downhill winner:  James Crawford (2 times)
 Women's Downhill winner:  A.J. Hurt (2 times)
 Super G winners:  Samuel Dupratt (m) /  A.J. Hurt (f)
 December 10 – 16, 2018: SNAC #2 in  Panorama Mountain Village
 Alpine Combined winners:  Jeffery Read (m) /  A.J. Hurt (f)
 Men's Super G winners:  Samuel Dupratt (#1) /  Sam Mulligan (#2)
 Women's Super G winners:  Nina O'Brien (#1) /  A.J. Hurt (#2)
 Men's Giant Slalom winners:  Simon Fournier (#1) /  Nicholas Krause (#2)
 Women's Giant Slalom winners:  Nina O'Brien (#1) /  Patricia Mangan (#2)
 Men's Slalom winners:  Mark Engel (#1) /  Simon Fournier (#2) 
 Women's Slalom winners:  Foreste Peterson (#1) /  Katie Hensien (#2)
 January 2 & 3: SNAC #3 in  Georgian Peaks Club
 Women's Giant Slalom winner:  Nina O'Brien (2 times)
 January 3 – 5: SNAC #4 in  Camp Fortune
 Men's Slalom winners:  Simon Fournier (#1) /  Benjamin Ritchie (#2)
 January 4: SNAC #5 in  Alpine Ski Club
 Women's Parallel Slalom winner:  Tuva Norbye 
 January 4 – 6: SNAC #6 in  Osler Bluff
 Women's Slalom winners:  Katie Hensien (#1) /  Nina O'Brien (#2)
 January 5 – 7: SNAC #7 in  Mont Ste. Marie
 Men's Giant Slalom winners:  Aage Solheim (#1) /  Nicholas Krause (#2)
 Men's Parallel Slalom winner:  Tobias Kogler
 February 5 – 8: SNAC #8  in  Sun Valley
 Men's Slalom winners:  Luke Winters (#1) /  Tobias Kogler (#2)
 Men's Giant Slalom winners:  Max Roeisland (#1) /  River Radamus (#2)
 February 5 – 8: SNAC #9 in  Snow King Mountain
 Women's Slalom winner:  Amelia Smart (2 times)
 Women's Giant Slalom winners:  Keely Cashman (#1) /  Adriana Jelinkova (#2)
 March 12 – 15: SNAC #10 in  Stowe Mountain Resort
 Women's Giant Slalom winners:  Mikaela Tommy (#1) /  Adriana Jelinkova (#2)
 Women's Slalom winners:  Amelia Smart (#1) /  Nina O'Brien (#2)
 March 12 – 15: SNAC #11 in  Burke Mountain Ski Area
 Men's Giant Slalom winner:  Tanguy Nef (2 times)
 Men's Slalom winners:  Kyle Negomir (#1) /  Fritz Dopfer (#2)
 March 16 – 21: SNAC #12 (final) in  Sugarloaf
 Men's Downhill winners:  Thomas Biesemeyer (#1) /  Ryan Cochran-Siegle (#2)
 Women's Downhill winners:  Nina O'Brien (#1) /  Alice Merryweather (#2)
 Alpine Combined winners:  Luke Winters (m) /  Nina O'Brien (f)
 Men's Super G winners:  Ryan Cochran-Siegle (#1) /  River Radamus (#2)
 Women's Super G winners:  Keely Cashman (#1) /  Nina O'Brien (#2)

2018–19 FIS Alpine Skiing Far East Cup
 Note: For the FIS page about these events, click here.
 December 4 – 7, 2018: FEC #1 in  Wanlong Ski Resorts
 Men's Slalom winners:  Jan Zabystřan (#1) /  Jung Dong-hyun (#2)
 Women's Slalom winners:  Asa Ando (#1) /  Liv Ceder (#2)
 Men's Giant Slalom winner:  Jung Dong-hyun (2 times)
 Women's Giant Slalom winners:  Asa Ando (#1) /  Piera Hudson (#2)
 December 10 – 13, 2018: FEC #2 in  Taiwoo Ski Resorts
 Men's Slalom winners:  Kamen Zlatkov (#1) /  Jung Dong-hyun (#2)
 Women's Slalom winners:  Liv Ceder (#1) /  Piera Hudson (#2)
 Men's Giant Slalom winner:  Jung Dong-hyun (2 times)
 Women's Giant Slalom winner:  Piera Hudson (2 times)
 February 7 – 9: FEC #3 in  Yongpyong Resort
 Note: The Super G events here were cancelled.
 Slalom winners:  Jung Dong-hyun (m) /  Gim So-hui (f)
 Giant Slalom winners:  Jung Dong-hyun (m) /  Kang Young-seo (f)
 February 12 – 15: FEC #4 in  Bears Town Resort
 Men's Slalom winners:  Hideyuki Narita (#1) /  Yohei Koyama (#2)
 Women's Slalom winner:  Makiko Arai (2 times)
 Men's Giant Slalom winners:  Noel von Gruenigen (#1) /  Seigo Kato (#2)
 Women's Giant Slalom winners:  Konatsu Hasumi (#1) /  Kang Young-seo (#2)
 February 24 – 27: FEC #5 in  Hanawa
 Men's Giant Slalom winner:  Reto Schmidiger (2 times)
 Women's Giant Slalom winner:  Asa Ando (2 times)
 Slalom winners:  Reto Schmidiger (m) /  Chisaki Maeda (f)
 March 2 – 5: FEC #6 in  Engaru
 Giant Slalom winners:  Reto Schmidiger (m) /  Mio Arai (f)
 Men's Slalom winner:  Reto Schmidiger (2 times)
 Women's Slalom winner:  Michelle Kerven (2 times)
 March 19 – 25: FEC #7 (final) in  Yuzhno-Sakhalinsk
 Men's Super G winners:  Ivan Kuznetsov (#1) /  Jan Zabystřan (#2)
 Women's Super G winner:  Iulija Pleshkova (2 times)
 Alpine Combined winners:  Ivan Kuznetsov (m) /  Nevena Ignjatović (f)
 Men's Giant Slalom winner:  Pavel Trikhichev (2 times)
 Women's Giant Slalom winner:  Ana Bucik (2 times)
 Men's Slalom winners:  Pavel Trikhichev (#1) /  Jan Zabystřan (#2)
 Women's Slalom winners:  Maruša Ferk (#1) /  Ana Bucik (#2)

2018 FIS Alpine Skiing Australia & New Zealand Cup
 Note: For the FIS page about these events, click here.
 August 20 – 24: A&NZ #1 in  Hotham Alpine Resort
 Men's Giant Slalom winner:  Adam Žampa (2 times)
 Women's Giant Slalom winner:  Lena Dürr (2 times)
 Men's Slalom winners:  Steffan Winkelhorst (#1) /  Adam Žampa (#2)
 Women's Slalom winners:  Charlotte Chable (#1) /  Neja Dvornik (#2)
 August 27 – 30: A&NZ #2 in  Coronet Peak
 Men's Giant Slalom winners:  Adam Žampa (#1) /  Sam Maes (#2)
 Women's Giant Slalom winners:  Alice Robinson (#1) /  Katharina Truppe (#2)
 Men's Slalom winners:  Marc Rochat (#1) /  Adam Žampa (#2)
 Women's Slalom winners:  Charlotte Chable (#1) /  Charlie Guest (#2)
 September 3 – 6: A&NZ #3 (final) in  Mount Hutt
 Men's Super G winner:  Maarten Meiners (2 times)
 Women's Super G winner:  Alice Robinson (2 times)

2018 FIS Alpine Skiing South American Cup
 Note: For the FIS page about these events, click here.
 August 14 – 17: SAC #1 in  Cerro Catedral
 Note: The second set of Giant Slalom and Slalom events were cancelled.
 Slalom winners:  Tomas Birkner De Miguel (m) /  Francesca Baruzzi Farriol (f)
 Giant Slalom winners:  Vito Cottineau (m) /  Carolina Blaquier (f)
 August 25 – 28: SAC #2 in  Las Leñas
 Note: The Super G events were cancelled.
 Slalom winners:  Enrique Evia y Roca (m) /  Francesca Baruzzi Farriol (f)
 Men's Giant Slalom winners:  Diego Holscher (#1) /  Cristian Javier Simari Birkner (#2)
 Women's Giant Slalom winners:  Francesca Baruzzi Farriol (#1) /  Andrea Ellenberger (#2)
 September 1: SAC #3 in  El Colorado #1
 Giant Slalom winners:  Rasmus Windingstad (m) /  Kajsa Vickhoff Lie (f)
 September 2 – 7: SAC #4 in  La Parva
 Slalom winners:  Ondřej Berndt (m) /  Kristin Lysdahl (f)
 Men's Downhill winners:  Klemen Kosi (#1) /  Dominik Schwaiger (#2)
 Women's Downhill winner:  Aleksandra Prokopyeva (2 times)
 Men's Super G winners:  Johan Clarey (#1) /  Andreas Sander (#2)
 Women's Super G winner:  Aleksandra Prokopyeva (2 times)
 September 10 – 13: SAC #5 in  El Colorado #2
 Note: All other alpine skiing events, except for the Super G ones, were cancelled.
 Men's Super G winners:  Manuel Schmid (#1) /  Klemen Kosi (#2)
 Women's Super G winners:  Ilka Štuhec (#1) /  Cande Moreno Becerra (#2)
 September 17 – 20: SAC #6 (final) in  Cerro Castor
 Men's Slalom winners:  Jean-Baptiste Grange (#1) /  Simon Maurberger (#2)
 Women's Slalom winner:  Mireia Gutiérrez (2 times)
 Giant Slalom winners:  Pavel Trikhichev (m) /  Tessa Worley (f)

2018 FIS Grass Skiing World Cup & Junior World Championship 
 Note 1: For the FIS page about the World Cup events, click here.
 Note 2: For the FIS page about the Junior World Championships event, click here.
 June 16 & 17, 2018: GSWC #1 in  Rettenbach
 Giant Slalom winners:  Edoardo Frau (m) /  Kristin Hetfleisch (f)
 Super Combined winners:  Mirko Hüppi (m) /  Kristin Hetfleisch (f)
 Super G winners:  Edoardo Frau (m) /  Kristin Hetfleisch (f)
 June 30 & July 1, 2018: GSWC #2 in  Předklášteří
 Giant Slalom winners:  Hannes Angerer (m) /  Jacqueline Gerlach (f)
 Slalom winners:  Mirko Hüppi (m) /  Jacqueline Gerlach (f)
 July 28 & 29, 2018: GSWC #3 in  Montecampione
 Giant Slalom winners:  Edoardo Frau (m) /  Chisaki Maeda (f)
 Slalom winners:  Lorenzo Dante Marco Gritti (m) /  Kristin Hetfleisch (f)
 July 30 – August 4, 2018: 2018 FIS Grass Ski Junior World Championships in  Montecampione
 Giant Slalom winners:  Martin Barták (m) /  Chisaki Maeda (f)
 Slalom winners:  Martin Barták (m) /  Chisaki Maeda (f)
 Super Combined winners:  Martin Barták (m) /  Chisaki Maeda (f)
 Super G winners:  Martin Barták (m) /  Chisaki Maeda (f)
 August 18 & 19: GSWC #4 in  San Sicario
 Super Combined winners:  Edoardo Frau (m) /  Jacqueline Gerlach (f)
 Super G winners:  Edoardo Frau (m) /  Jacqueline Gerlach (f)
 Giant Slalom winners:  Edoardo Frau (m) /  Jacqueline Gerlach (f)
 August 31 – September 2: GSWC #5 in  Santa Caterina di Valfurva
 Note: The men's & women's parallel slalom events here were cancelled.
 Men's Slalom winner:  Lorenzo Dante Marco Gritti (2 times)
 Women's Slalom winners:  Lisa Wusits (#1) /  Kristin Hetfleisch (#2)
 September 13 – 16: GSWC #6 (final) in  Sauris
 Giant Slalom winners:  Stefan Portmann (m) /  Kristin Hetfleisch (f)
 Slalom winners:  Lorenzo Dante Marco Gritti (m) /  Jacqueline Gerlach (f)
 Super Combined winners:  Edoardo Frau (m) /  Jacqueline Gerlach (f)
 Super G winners:  Stefan Portmann (m) /  Jacqueline Gerlach (f)

Biathlon

International biathlon championships
 August 21 – 26, 2018: 2018 IBU Summer Biathlon World Championships in  Nové Město na Moravě
 Sprint winners:  Michal Krčmář (m) /  Paulína Fialková (f)
 Junior Sprint winners:  Jakub Stvrtecky (m) /  Kamila Żuk (f)
 Pursuit winners:  Ondřej Moravec (m) /  Veronika Vítková (f)
 Junior Pursuit winners:  Viacheslav Maleev (m) /  Valeriia Vasnetcova (f)
 Mixed Relay winners:  (Ekaterina Yurlova-Percht, Margarita Vasileva, Nikita Porshnev, & Yury Shopin)
 Junior Mixed Relay winners:  (Petra Sucha, Tereza Vobornikova, Jakub Stvrtecky, & Vitezslav Hornig)
 January 26 – February 3: 2019 IBU Youth/Junior World Championships in  Brezno-Osrblie
 Junior Individual winners:  Martin Bourgeois Republique (m) /  MENG Fanqi (f)
 Junior Sprint winners:  Vebjoern Soerum (m) /  Ekaterina Bekh (f)
 Junior Pursuit winners:  Vebjoern Soerum (m) /  Ekaterina Bekh (f)
 Junior Men's Relay winners:  (Said Karimulla Khalili, Ilnaz Mukhamedzianov, Vadim Istamgulov, & Vasilii Tomshin)
 Junior Women's Relay winners:  (Camille Bened, Sophie Chauveau, & Lou Jeanmonnot)
 Youth Individual winners:  Niklas Hartweg (m) /  Ukaleq Astri Slettemark (f)
 Youth Sprint winners:  Alex Cisar (m) /  Maren Bakken (f)
 Youth Pursuit winners:  Alex Cisar (m) /  Amy Baserga (f)
 Youth Men's Relay winners:  (Hendrik Rudolph, Darius Philipp Lodl, & Hans Koellner)
 Youth Women's Relay winners:  (Maren Bakken, Marte Moeller, & Anne de Besche)
 February 18 – 24: 2019 IBU Open European Championships in  Minsk-Raubichi
 Individual winners:  Krasimir Anev (m) /  Hanna Öberg (f)
 Sprint winners:  Tarjei Bø (m) /  Mona Brorsson (f)
 Pursuit winners:  Tarjei Bø (m) /  Ekaterina Yurlova-Percht (f)
 Single Mixed Relay winners:  (Evgeniya Pavlova & Dmitry Malyshko)
 Mixed Relay winners:  (Emma Nilsson, Mona Brorsson, Martin Ponsiluoma, & Sebastian Samuelsson)
 March 4 – 10: 2019 IBU Junior Open European Championships in  Sjusjøen
 Junior Individual winners:  Tim Grotian (m) /  Camille Bened (f)
 Junior Sprint winners:  Sivert Guttorm Bakken (m) /  Camille Bened (f)
 Junior Pursuit winners:  Julian Hollandt (m) /  Juliane Frühwirt (f)
 Junior Single Mixed Relay winners:  (Ksenia Dovgaya & Igor Malinovskii)
 Junior Mixed Relay winners:  (Anastasiia Goreeva, Alina Klevtsova, Aleksandr Bektuganov, & Said Karimulla Khalili)
 March 7 – 17: Biathlon World Championships 2019 in  Östersund
 Individual winners:  Arnd Peiffer (m) /  Hanna Öberg (f)
 Sprint winners:  Johannes Thingnes Bø (m) /  Anastasiya Kuzmina (f)
 Pursuit winners:  Dmytro Pidruchnyi (m) /  Denise Herrmann (f)
 Men's Relay winners:  (Lars Helge Birkeland, Vetle Sjåstad Christiansen, Tarjei Bø, & Johannes Thingnes Bø)
 Women's Relay winners:  (Synnøve Solemdal, Ingrid Landmark Tandrevold, Tiril Eckhoff, Marte Olsbu Røiseland)
 Single Mixed Relay winners:  (Marte Olsbu Røiseland & Johannes Thingnes Bø)
 Mixed Relay winners:  (Marte Olsbu Røiseland, Tiril Eckhoff, Johannes Thingnes Bø, & Vetle Sjåstad Christiansen)
 Mass Start winners:  Dominik Windisch (m) /  Dorothea Wierer (f)

2018–19 Biathlon World Cup
 November 30 – December 9, 2018: BWC #1 in  Pokljuka
 Individual winners:  Martin Fourcade (m) /  Yuliia Dzhima (f)
 Pursuit winners:  Johannes Thingnes Bø (m) /  Kaisa Mäkäräinen (f)
 Sprint winners:  Johannes Thingnes Bø (m) /  Kaisa Mäkäräinen (f)
 Single Mixed Relay winners:  (Thekla Brun-Lie & Lars Helge Birkeland)
 Mixed Relay winners:  (Anaïs Bescond, Justine Braisaz, Martin Fourcade, & Simon Desthieux)
 December 10 – 16, 2018: BWC #2 in  Hochfilzen
 Pursuit winners:  Martin Fourcade (m) /  Kaisa Mäkäräinen (f)
 Sprint winners:  Johannes Thingnes Bø (m) /  Dorothea Wierer (f)
 Men's Relay winners:  (Peppe Femling, Martin Ponsiluoma, Torstein Stenersen, & Sebastian Samuelsson)
 Women's Relay winners:  (Lisa Vittozzi, Alexia Runggaldier, Dorothea Wierer, & Federica Sanfilippo)
 December 17 – 23, 2018: BWC #3 in  Nové Město na Moravě
 Pursuit winners:  Johannes Thingnes Bø (m) /  Marte Olsbu Røiseland (f)
 Sprint winners:  Johannes Thingnes Bø (m) /  Marte Olsbu Røiseland (f)
 Mass Start winners:  Johannes Thingnes Bø (m) /  Anastasiya Kuzmina (f)
 January 7 – 13: BWC #4 in  Oberhof
 Pursuit winners:  Johannes Thingnes Bø (m) /  Lisa Vittozzi (f)
 Sprint winners:  Alexandr Loginov (m) /  Lisa Vittozzi (f)
 Men's Relay winners:  (Maxim Tsvetkov, Evgeniy Garanichev, Dmitry Malyshko, & Alexandr Loginov)
 Women's Relay winners:  (Evgeniya Pavlova, Margarita Vasileva, Larisa Kuklina, & Ekaterina Yurlova-Percht)
 January 14 – 20: BWC #5 in  Ruhpolding
 Sprint winners:  Johannes Thingnes Bø (m) /  Anastasiya Kuzmina (f)
 Men's Relay winners:  (Lars Helge Birkeland, Vetle Sjåstad Christiansen, Tarjei Bø, & Johannes Thingnes Bø)
 Women's Relay winners:  (Julia Simon, Anaïs Bescond, Justine Braisaz, & Anaïs Chevalier)
 Mass Start winners:  Johannes Thingnes Bø (m) /  Franziska Preuß (f)
 January 21 – 27: BWC #6 in  Antholz-Anterselva
 Pursuit winners:  Johannes Thingnes Bø (m) /  Dorothea Wierer (f)
 Sprint winners:  Johannes Thingnes Bø (m) /  Markéta Davidová (f)
 Mass Start winners:  Quentin Fillon Maillet (m) /  Laura Dahlmeier (f)
 February 4 – 10: BWC #7 in  Canmore
 Note: The men's and women's sprint events here were cancelled.
 Short Individual winners:  Johannes Thingnes Bø (m) /  Tiril Eckhoff (f)
 Men's Relay winners:  (Lars Helge Birkeland, Vetle Sjåstad Christiansen, Erlend Bjøntegaard, & Johannes Thingnes Bø)
 Women's Relay winners:  (Vanessa Hinz, Franziska Hildebrand, Denise Herrmann, &  Laura Dahlmeier)
 February 11 – 17: BWC #8 in  Soldier Hollow
 Sprint winners:  Vetle Sjåstad Christiansen (m) /  Marte Olsbu Røiseland (f)
 Pursuit winners:  Quentin Fillon Maillet (m) /  Denise Herrmann (f)
 Single Mixed Relay winners:  (Lukas Hofer & Dorothea Wierer)
 Mixed Relay winners:  (Quentin Fillon Maillet, Simon Desthieux, Célia Aymonier, & Anaïs Chevalier)
 March 18 – 24: BWC #9 (final) in  Oslo-Holmenkollen
 Sprint winners:  Johannes Thingnes Bø (m) /  Anastasiya Kuzmina (f)
 Pursuit winners:  Johannes Thingnes Bø (m) /  Anastasiya Kuzmina (f)
 Mass Start winners:  Johannes Thingnes Bø (m) /  Hanna Öberg (f)

2018–19 IBU Cup
 November 26 – December 2, 2018: IBU Cup #1 in  Idre
 Pursuit winners:  Philipp Nawrath (m) /  Svetlana Mironova (f)
 Men's Sprint winners:  Anton Babikov (#1) /  Aristide Begue (#2)
 Women's Sprint winners:  Ingela Andersson (#1) /  Elisabeth Högberg (#2)
 December 10 – 16, 2018: IBU Cup #2 in  Ridnaun-Val Ridanna
 Pursuit winners:  Johannes Dale (m) /  Anastasiia Morozova (f)
 Sprint winners:  Johannes Dale (m) /  Anastasiia Morozova (f)
 Single Mixed Relay winners:  (Anastasiia Morozova & Sergey Korastylev)
 Mixed Relay winners:  (Irina Kazakevich, Svetlana Mironova, Yury Shopin, & Anton Babikov)
 December 17 – 22, 2018: IBU Cup #3 in  Obertilliach
 Individual winners:  Simon Fourcade (m) /  Caroline Colombo (f)
 Sprint winners:  Sivert Guttorm Bakken (m) /  Nadia Moser (f)
 Super Sprint winners:  Sindre Pettersen (m) /  Felicia Lindqvist (f)
 January 7 – 13: IBU Cup #4 in  Duszniki-Zdrój
 Men's Sprint winners:  Alexander Povarnitsyn (#1) /  Philipp Horn (#2)
 Women's Sprint winner:  Natalia Gerbulova (2 times)
 January 14 – 20: IBU Cup #5 in  Großer Arber
 Short Individual winners:  Alexander Povarnitsyn (m) /  Yuliya Zhuravok (f)
 Sprint winners:  Aristide Begue (m) /  Victoria Slivko (f)
 Pursuit winners:  Anton Babikov (m) /  Victoria Slivko (f)
 January 21 – 27: IBU Cup #6 in  Lenzerheide
 Sprint winners:  Fabien Claude (m) /  Victoria Slivko (f)
 Pursuit winners:  Fabien Claude (m) /  Uliana Kaisheva (f)
 Single Mixed Relay winners:  (Sergey Korastylev & Uliana Kaisheva)
 Mixed Relay winners:  (Anton Babikov, Alexey Slepov, Valeriia Vasnetcova, & Victoria Slivko)
 February 25 – March 2: IBU Cup #7 in  Otepää
 Super Sprint winners:  Endre Stroemsheim (m) /  Anna Weidel (f)
 Sprint winners:  David Zobel (m) /  Chloe Chevalier (f)
 March 11 – 17: IBU Cup #8 (final) in  Martell-Val Martello
 Men's Sprint winners:  Johannes Dale (#1) /  Lucas Fratzscher (#2)
 Women's Sprint winners:  Olga Abramova (#1) /  Caroline Colombo (#2)
 Mass Start winners:  Aristide Begue (m) /  Caroline Colombo (f)

2018–19 IBU Junior Cup
 December 10 – 16, 2018: IBUJC #1 in  Lenzerheide
 Junior Individual winners:  Patrick Braunhofer (m) /  Camille Bened (f)
 Junior Sprint winners:  Viacheslav Maleev (m) /  Paula Botet (f)
 December 17 – 22, 2018: IBUJC #2 in  Les Rousses
 Junior Pursuit winners:  Said Karimulla Khalili (m) /  Juliane Frühwirt (f)
 Junior Sprint winners:  Sebastian Stalder (m) /  Anastasiia Kaisheva (f)
 Junior Single Mixed Relay winners:  (Alex Cisar & Nika Vindisar)
 Junior Mixed Relay winners:  (Sebastien Mahon, Pierre Monney, Gilonne Guigonnat, & Paula Botet)
 February 25 – March 3: IBUJC #3 (final) in  Sjusjøen
 Note: This event was supposed to be held in Torsby, but it was moved to the new location here.
 Junior Men's Sprint winners:  Alex Cisar (#1) /  Tim Grotian (#2)
 Junior Women's Sprint winners:  Amanda Lundstroem (#1) /  Anastasiia Goreeva (#2)

Cross-country skiing

International cross-country skiing events
 January 19 – 27: Part of the 2019 Nordic Junior World Ski Championships in  Lahti
 Sprint Classical winners:  Alexander Terentev (m) /  Kristine Stavaas Skistad (f)
 Freestyle winners:  Jules Chappaz (m) /  Frida Karlsson (f)
 Classical Mass Start winners:  Luca del Fabbro (m) /  Frida Karlsson (f)
 Men's Mass Start Relay winners:  (Luke Jager, Ben Ogden, Johnny Hagenbuch, & Gus Schumacher)
 Women's Mass Start Relay winners:  (Kristin Austgulen Fosnaes, Astrid Stav, Helene Marie Fossesholm, & Kristine Stavaas Skistad)
 February 19 – March 3: Part of the FIS Nordic World Ski Championships 2019 in  Seefeld
 Sprint Freestyle winners:  Johannes Høsflot Klæbo (m) /  Maiken Caspersen Falla (f)
 Skiathlon winners:  Sjur Røthe (m) /  Therese Johaug (f)
 Men's Team Sprint Classical winners:  (Emil Iversen & Johannes Høsflot Klæbo)
 Women's Team Sprint Classical winners:  (Stina Nilsson & Maja Dahlqvist)
 Classical winners:  Martin Johnsrud Sundby (m) /  Therese Johaug (f)
 Men's 4×10 km Relay winners:  (Emil Iversen, Martin Johnsrud Sundby, Sjur Røthe, & Johannes Høsflot Klæbo)
 Women's 4×5 km Relay winners:  (Ebba Andersson, Frida Karlsson, Charlotte Kalla, & Stina Nilsson)
 Freestyle Mass Start winners:  Hans Christer Holund (m) /  Therese Johaug (f)

2018–19 Tour de Ski
 December 29 & 30, 2018: TdS #1 in  Toblach
 Sprint Freestyle winners:  Johannes Høsflot Klæbo (m) /  Stina Nilsson (f)
 Freestyle winners:  Sergey Ustiugov (m) /  Natalya Nepryaeva (f)
 January 1: TdS #2 in  Val Müstair
 Sprint Freestyle winners:  Johannes Høsflot Klæbo (m) /  Stina Nilsson (f)
 January 2 & 3: TdS #3 in  Oberstdorf
 Classical Mass Start winners:  Emil Iversen (m) /  Ingvild Flugstad Østberg (f)
 Freestyle Pursuit winners:  Johannes Høsflot Klæbo (m) /  Ingvild Flugstad Østberg (f)
 January 5 & 6: TdS #4 (final) in  Fiemme Valley
 Classical Mass Start winners:  Johannes Høsflot Klæbo (m) /  Ingvild Flugstad Østberg (f)
 Final Climb winners:  Johannes Høsflot Klæbo (m) /  Ingvild Flugstad Østberg (f)

2018–19 FIS Cross-Country World Cup
 Note: For the FIS page about these events, click here.
 November 24 & 25, 2018: CCWC #1 in  Ruka
 Classical winners:  Alexander Bolshunov (m) /  Therese Johaug (f)
 Sprint Classical winners:  Alexander Bolshunov (m) /  Yuliya Belorukova (f)
 November 30 – December 2, 2018: CCWC #2 in  Lillehammer
 Freestyle winners:  Sjur Røthe (m) /  Therese Johaug (f)
 Sprint Freestyle winners:  Federico Pellegrino (m) /  Jonna Sundling (f)
 Classical Pursuit winners:  Didrik Tønseth (m) /  Therese Johaug (f)
 December 8 & 9, 2018: CCWC #3 in  Beitostølen
 Freestyle winners:  Sjur Røthe (m) /  Therese Johaug (f)
 Men's Mass Start Relay winners:  (Emil Iversen, Martin Johnsrud Sundby, Sjur Røthe, & Finn Hågen Krogh)
 Women's Mass Start Relay winners:  (Heidi Weng, Therese Johaug, Ragnhild Haga, & Ingvild Flugstad Østberg)
 December 15 & 16, 2018: CCWC #4 in  Davos
 Sprint Freestyle winners:  Johannes Høsflot Klæbo (m) /  Stina Nilsson (f)
 Freestyle winners:  Evgeniy Belov (m) /  Therese Johaug (f)
 January 12 & 13: CCWC #5 in  Dresden
 Sprint Freestyle winners:  Sindre Bjørnestad Skar (m) /  Stina Nilsson (f)
 Men's Team Sprint Freestyle winners:  (Erik Valnes & Sindre Bjørnestad Skar)
 Women's Team Sprint Freestyle winners:  (Stina Nilsson & Maja Dahlqvist)
 January 19 & 20: CCWC #6 in  Otepää
 Sprint Classical winners:  Johannes Høsflot Klæbo (m) /  Maiken Caspersen Falla (f)
 Classical winners:  Iivo Niskanen (m) /  Therese Johaug (f)
 January 26 & 27: CCWC #7 in  Ulricehamn
 Freestyle winners:  Maurice Manificat (m) /  Therese Johaug (f)
 Men's Mass Start Relay winners:  (Evgeniy Belov, Alexander Bessmertnykh, Denis Spitsov, & Artem Maltsev)
 Women's Mass Start Relay winners:  (Heidi Weng, Therese Johaug, Astrid Uhrenholdt Jacobsen, & Ingvild Flugstad Østberg)
 February 9 & 10: CCWC #8 in  Lahti
 Sprint Freestyle winners:  Johannes Høsflot Klæbo (m) /  Maiken Caspersen Falla (f)
 Men's Team Sprint Classical winners:  (Emil Iversen & Johannes Høsflot Klæbo)
 Women's Team Sprint Classical winners:  (Ida Ingemarsdotter & Maja Dahlqvist)
 February 16 & 17: CCWC #9 in  Cogne
 Sprint Freestyle winners:  Federico Pellegrino (m) /  Jessie Diggins (f)
 Classical winners:  Alexander Bolshunov (m) /  Kerttu Niskanen (f)
 March 9 & 10: CCWC #10 in  Oslo
 Classical Mass Start winners:  Alexander Bolshunov (m) /  Therese Johaug (f)
 March 12: CCWC #11 in  Drammen
 Sprint Classical winners:  Johannes Høsflot Klæbo (m) /  Maiken Caspersen Falla (f)
 March 16 & 17: CCWC #12 in  Falun
 Sprint Freestyle winners:  Johannes Høsflot Klæbo (m) /  Stina Nilsson (f)
 Freestyle winners:  Alexander Bolshunov (m) /  Therese Johaug (f)
 March 22 – 24: CCWC #13 (final) in  Quebec City
 Sprint Freestyle winners:  Johannes Høsflot Klæbo (m) /  Stina Nilsson (f)
 Classical Mass Start winners:  Johannes Høsflot Klæbo (m) /  Stina Nilsson (f)
 Freestyle Pursuit winners:  Johannes Høsflot Klæbo (m) /  Stina Nilsson (f)

2018–19 FIS Cross-Country Skiing Alpen Cup
 Note: For the FIS page about these events, click here.
 December 8 & 9, 2018: CCSAC #1 in  Prémanon
 Event cancelled.
 December 21 – 23, 2018: CCSAC #2 in  Valdidentro-Isolaccia
 Sprint Freestyle winners:  Richard Jouve (m) /  Laurien van der Graaff (f)
 Freestyle winners:  Andreas Katz (m) /  Elisa Brocard (f)
 Classical Mass Start winners:  Maurice Manificat (m) /  Antonia Fraebel (f)
 January 4 – 6: CCSAC #3 in  Nové Město na Moravě
 Sprint Classical winners:  Valentin Chauvin (m) /  Antonia Fraebel (f)
 Freestyle winners:  Robin Duvillard (m) /  Antonia Fraebel (f)
 Classical Mass Start winners:  Valentin Chauvin (m) /  Antonia Fraebel (f)
 February 8 – 10: CCSAC #4 in  Planica
 Men's Sprint Freestyle winners:  Jules Chappaz (#1) /  Claudio Muller (#2)
 Women's Sprint Freestyle winners:  Anna-Maria Dietze (#1) /  Ilaria Debertolis (#2)
 Men's Classical winners:  Jules Chappaz (#1) /  Alexey Poltoranin (#2)
 Women's Classical winners:  Lisa Lohmann (#1) /  Lucia Scardoni (#2)
 Men's Freestyle Mass Start winners:  Jules Chappaz (#1) /  Max Hauke (#2)
 Women's Freestyle Mass Start winners:  Barbora Havlíčková (#1) /  Ilaria Debertolis (#2)
 March 2 & 3: CCSAC #5 in  Le Brassus
 Freestyle winners:  Hugo Lapalus (m) /  Laura Chamiot Maitral (f)
 Classical Pursuit winners:  Valentin Chauvin (m) /  Julia Belger (f)
 March 15 – 17: CCSAC #6 (final) in  Oberwiesenthal
 Men's Sprint Freestyle winners:  Davide Graz (#1) /  Janik Riebli (#2)
 Women's Sprint Freestyle winners:  Lisa Lohmann (#1) /  Katerina Janatova (#2)
 Men's Classical Mass Start winners:  Luca del Fabbro (#1) /  Valentin Chauvin (#2)
 Women's Classical Mass Start winners:  Barbora Havlíčková (#1) /  Antonia Fraebel (#2)
 Freestyle Pursuit winners:  Clement Arnault (m) /  Kateřina Razýmová (f)
 Men's Freestyle Relay winners:  (Theo Schely, Victor Lovera, & Jules Chappaz)
 Women's Freestyle Relay winners:  (Pavlina Votockova, Zuzana Holikova, & Barbora Havlíčková)

2018–19 FIS Cross-Country Skiing Eastern Europe Cup
 Note: For the FIS page about these events, click here.
 November 22 – 26, 2018: EEC #1 in  Vershina Tea
 Sprint Classical winners:  Ilia Poroshkin (m) /  Olga Tsareva (f)
 Sprint Freestyle winners:  Alexander Terentev (m) /  Olga Tsareva (f)
 Classical winners:  Sergey Ardashev (m) /  Diana Golovan (f)
 Freestyle winners:  Alexander Bessmertnykh (m) /  Anna Nechaevskaya (f)
 December 22 – 26, 2018: EEC #2 in  Krasnogorsk #1
 Sprint Classical winners:  Ermil Vokuev (m) /  Natalia Matveeva (f)
 Freestyle winners:  Ivan Yakimushkin (m) /  Tatiana Aleshina (f)
 Sprint Freestyle winners:  Ivan Yakimushkin (m) /  Natalia Matveeva (f)
 Classical winners:  Alexander Bessmertnykh (m) /  Alisa Zhambalova (f)
 January 10 – 13: EEC #3 in  Raubichi
 Sprint Classical winners:  Ilia Semikov (m) /  Anastasia Kirillova (f)
 Classical winners:  Ermil Vokuev (m) /  Alisa Zhambalova (f)
 Freestyle winners:  Ilia Poroshkin (m) /  Alisa Zhambalova (f)
 February 8 – 10: EEC #4 in  Krasnogorsk #2
 Classical winners:  Andrey Parfenov (m) /  Alisa Zhambalova (f)
 Sprint Freestyle winners:  Andrey Parfenov (m) /  Anastasia Vlasova (f)
 February 23 – 27: EEC #5 (final) in  Syktyvkar
 Classical winners:  Ilia Semikov (m) /  Yevgeniya Shapovalova (f)
 Sprint Freestyle winners:  Andrey Parfenov (m) /  Aida Bayazitova (f)
 Skiathlon winners:  Alexey Vitsenko (m) /  Svetlana Plotnikova (f)

2018–19 FIS Cross-Country Skiing US Super Tour
 Note: For the FIS page about these events, click here.
 December 1 & 2, 2018: UST #1 in  Rendezvous Ski Trails (West Yellowstone)
 Sprint Freestyle winners:  Andrew Newell (m) /  Julia Kern (f)
 Freestyle winners:  Benjamin Lustgarten (m) /  Rosie Frankowski (f)
 January 25 – 27: UST #2 in  Mount Van Hoevenberg (Lake Placid)
 Freestyle winners:  Kyle Bratrud (m) /  Jessica Yeaton (f)
 Sprint Classical winners:  Antoine Briand (m) /  Sophie Caldwell (f)
 Classical Mass Start winners:  Kyle Bratrud (m) /  Kaitlynn Miller (f)
 February 15 – 17: UST #3 in  Theodore Wirth Park (Minneapolis)
 Sprint Freestyle winners:  Antoine Briand (m) /  Alayna Sonnesyn (f)
 Classical Mass Start winners:  Zak Ketterson (m) /  Kaitlynn Miller (f)
 Freestyle winners:  Matthew Edward Liebsch (m) /  Nicole Schneider (f)
 March 28 – April 2: UST #4 (final) in  Presque Isle
 Sprint Freestyle winners:  Simi Hamilton (m) /  Sadie Bjornsen (f)
 Classical Mass Start winners:  Erik Bjornsen (m) /  Sadie Bjornsen (f)
 Mass Start Mixed Relay winners:

2018–19 FIS Cross-Country Skiing Nor-Am Cup
 Note: For the FIS page about these events, click here.
 December 8 & 9, 2018: SNAC #1 in  Vernon
 Sprint Freestyle winners:  Andrew Newell (m) /  Julia Kern (f)
 Classical winners:  Kyle Bratrud (m) /  Katherine Stewart-Jones (f)
 December 13 – 16, 2018: SNAC #2 in  Canmore Nordic Centre
 Sprint Classical winners:  Bob Thompson (m) /  Dahria Beatty (f)
 Freestyle winners:  Russell Kennedy (m) /  Dahria Beatty (f)
 Classical Mass Start winners:  Bob Thompson (m) /  Dahria Beatty (f)
 January 18 – 20: SNAC #3 in  Sherbrooke
 Sprint Freestyle winners:  Russell Kennedy (m) / (f)
 Classical winners:  Scott James Hill (m) /  Katherine Stewart-Jones (f)
 Freestyle Mass Start winners:  Russell Kennedy (m) /  Katherine Stewart-Jones (f)
 February 1 – 3: SNAC #4 (final) in  Duntroon
 Sprint Classical winners:  Julien Locke (m) /  Zoe Williams (f)
 Classical winners:  Alexis Dumas (m) /  Zoe Williams (f)
 Freestyle Pursuit winners:  Jack Carlyle (m) /  Laura Leclair (f)

2018–19 FIS Cross-Country Skiing Slavic Cup
 Note: For the FIS page about these events, click here.
 December 15 & 16, 2018: SSC #1 in  Štrbské Pleso #1
 Classical winners:  Peter Mlynár (m) /  Justyna Kowalczyk (f)
 Sprint Freestyle winners:  Paweł Klisz (m) /  Eliza Rucka (f)
 December 29 & 30, 2018: SSC #2 in  Štrbské Pleso #2
 Freestyle winners:  Jan Koristek (m) /  Izabela Marcisz (f)
 Classical winners:  Jan Koristek (m) /  Justyna Kowalczyk (f)
 February 2 & 3: SSC #3 in  Zakopane
 Classical winners:  Jan Koristek (m) /  Justyna Kowalczyk (f)
 Freestyle winners:  Jan Koristek (m) /  Izabela Marcisz (f)
 March 9 & 10: SSC #4 in  Wisła Kubalonka
 Sprint Classical winners:  Maciej Staręga (m) /  Alena Procházková (f)
 Freestyle winners:  Dominik Bury (m) /  Izabela Marcisz (f)
 March 23 & 24: SSC #5 (final) in  Kremnica-Skalksa
 Classical winners:  Dominik Bury (m) /  Justyna Kowalczyk (f)
 Freestyle Mass Start winners:  Dominik Bury (m) /  Izabela Marcisz (f)

2018–19 FIS Cross-Country Skiing Far East Cup
 Note: For the FIS page about these events, click here.
 December 16 & 17, 2018: FEC #1 in  Alpensia Cross-Country and Biathlon Centre #1
 Classical winners:  Nobuhito Kashiwabara (m) /  Yukari Tanaka (f)
 Freestyle winners:  Hikari Fujinoki (m) /  Lee Chae-won (f)
 December 25 – 27, 2018: FEC #2 in  Otoineppu
 Classical winners:  Naoto Baba (m) /  Chika Kobayashi (f)
 Freestyle winners:  Naoto Baba (m) /  Miki Kodama (f)
 January 6 – 8: FEC #3, FEC #4, & FEC #5 in  Sapporo
 Classical winners:  Takanori Ebina (m) /  Kozue Takizawa (f)
 Sprint Freestyle winners:  Nobuhito Kashiwabara (m) /  Yuka Watanabe (f)
 Freestyle winners:  Naoto Baba (m) /  Miki Kodama (f)
 January 16 & 17: FEC #6 in  Alpensia Cross-Country and Biathlon Centre #2
 Classical winners:  Hikari Fujinoki (m) /  Yukari Tanaka (f)
 Freestyle winners:  Hikari Fujinoki (m) /  Lee Chae-won (f)
 March 2 & 3: FEC #7 (final) in  Shiramine
 Sprint Classical winners:  Hikari Fujinoki (m) /  Yukari Tanaka (f)
 Sprint Freestyle winners:  Tomoki Sato (m) /  Yukari Tanaka (f)

2018–19 FIS Cross-Country Skiing Scandinavian Cup
 Note: For the FIS page about these events, click here.
 December 14 – 16, 2018: CCSC #1 in  Östersund
 Note: The classical events here were cancelled.
 Sprint Classical winners:  Paal Troean Aune (m) /  Anna Svendsen (f)
 Freestyle winners:  Daniel Rickardsson (m) /  Astrid Oeyre Slind (f)
 January 4 – 6: CCSC #2 in  Vuokatti
 Sprint Freestyle winners:  Erik Valnes (m) /  Johanna Hagström (f)
 Classical winners:  Livo Niskanen (m) /  Frida Karlsson (f)
 Freestyle Mass Start winners:  Mattis Stenshagen (m) /  Frida Karlsson (f)
 March 1 – 3: CCSC #3 (final) in  Madona
 Sprint Freestyle winners:  Gjoeran Tefre (m) /  Moa Lundgren (f)
 Classical winners:  Daniel Stock (m) /  Johanna Hagström (f)
 Freestyle Pursuit winners:  Martin Loewstroem Nyenget (m) /  Moa Lundgren (f)

2019 FIS Cross-Country Skiing Balkan Cup
 Note: For the FIS page about these events, click here.
 January 12 & 13: BC #1 in  Ravna Gora
 Event cancelled.
 February 2 & 3: BC #2 in  Pigadia
 Men's Freestyle winner:  Martin Penchev (2 times)
 Women's Freestyle winner:  Vedrana Malec (2 times)
 February 9 & 10: BC #3 in  Sjenica
 Men's Freestyle winner:  Strahinja Eric (2 times)
 Women's Freestyle winner:  Sanja Kusmuk (2 times)
 February 13 & 14: BC #4 in  Mavrovo
 Note: The second men's and women's freestyle events here was cancelled.
 Freestyle winners:  Edi Dadić (m) /  Vedrana Malec (f)
 March 2 & 3: BC #5 in  Ravna Gora
 Men's Classical & Freestyle winner:  Tobias Habenicht
 Women's Classical & Freestyle winner:  Nika Jagecic
 March 9 & 10: BC #6 in  Dvorista
 Men's Freestyle winner:  Edi Dadić (2 times)
 Women's Freestyle winner:  Vedrana Malec (2 times)
 March 17 & 18: BC #7 in  Borovets
 Event cancelled.
 March 23 & 24: BC #8 (final) in  Bolu-Gerede
 Classical winners:  Paul Constantin Pepene (m) /  Vedrana Malec (f)
 Freestyle winners:  Petrică Hogiu (m) /  Vedrana Malec (f)

2018 FIS Cross-Country Skiing Australia & New Zealand Cup
 Note: For the FIS page about these events, click here.
 July 21 & 22: ANZC #1 in  Perisher Valley
 Classical winners:  Phillip Bellingham (m) /  Chelsea Moore (f)
 Freestyle winners:  Callum Watson (m) /  Barbara Jezeršek (f)
 August 18 & 19: ANZC #2 in  Falls Creek
 Sprint 1 km Freestyle winners:  Ole Jacob Forsmo (m) /  Emily Champion (f)
 Classical winners:  Phillip Bellingham (m) /  Casey Wright (f)
 September 4 – 6: ANZC #3 (final) in  Snow Farm
 Freestyle winners:  Kyle Bratrud (m) /  Jessie Diggins (f)
 Sprint 1.6 km Freestyle winners:  Kevin Bolger (m) /  Sophie Caldwell (f)
 Classical Mass Start winners:  Benjamin Saxton (m) /  Jessie Diggins (f)

Freestyle skiing

World championships (Freestyle)
 August 24 – September 8, 2018: Part of the FIS Junior Freestyle Ski & Snowboard World Championships 2018 in  Cardrona Alpine Resort
 Big Air winners:  Mac Forehand (m) /  Anastasia Tatalina (f)
 Ski Cross winners:  Oliver Davies (m) /  Mikayla Martin (f)
 Slopestyle winners:  Oliwer Magnusson (m) /  Kelly Sildaru (f)
 Halfpipe winners:  Nico Porteous (m) /  Kelly Sildaru (f)
 January 26 – April 14: FIS Junior Freestyle Ski & Snowboard World Championships 2019 (Freestyle) in  Leysin,  Reiteralm,  Chiesa in Valmalenco, &  Klaeppen
 Leysin (January 26 & 27)
 Halfpipe winners:  Connor Ladd (m) /  Constance Brogden (f)
 Reiteralm (March 28 & 29)
 Ski Cross winners:  David Mobaerg (m) /  Zoe Chore (f)
 Chiesa in Valmalenco (April 1 – 6)
 Aerials winners:  Viachaslau Tsimertsau (m) /  Sniazhana Drabiankova (f)
 Moguls winners:  Nikita Novitckii (m) /  Sabrina Cass (f)
 Dual Moguls winners:  Elliot Vaillancourt (m) /  Anastasia Smirnova (f)
 Klaeppen (April 4 – 14)
 Slopestyle winners:  Edouard Therriault (m) /  Kelly Sildaru (f)
 Big Air winners:  Ulrik Samnoey (m) /  Kelly Sildaru (f)
 February 1 – 10: Part of the FIS Freestyle Ski and Snowboarding World Championships 2019 in  Park City, Deer Valley, & Solitude Mountain Resort
 The women's slopestyle event here was cancelled.
 Moguls winners:  Mikaël Kingsbury (m) /  Yuliya Galysheva (f)
 Dual Moguls winners:  Mikaël Kingsbury (m) /  Perrine Laffont (f)
 Aerials winners:  Maxim Burov (m) /  Aliaksandra Ramanouskaya (f)
 Team Aerials winners:  (Carol Bouvard, Nicolas Gygax, & Noé Roth)
 Big Air winners:  Fabian Bösch (m) /  Tess Ledeux (f)
 Halfpipe winners:  Aaron Blunck (m) /  Kelly Sildaru (f)
 Men's Slopestyle winner:  James Woods
 Ski Cross winners:  François Place (m) /  Marielle Thompson (f)

2018–19 FIS Freestyle Skiing World Cup
 September 5, 2018 – March 30, 2019: 2018–19 FIS Freestyle Skiing World Cup Schedule

Moguls and Aerials
 Note: For the FIS page about these events, click here.
 December 7, 2018: MAWC #1 in  Ruka
 Moguls winners:  Mikaël Kingsbury (m) /  Perrine Laffont (f)
 December 15 & 16, 2018: MAWC #2 in  Thaiwoo (Chongli District, Zhangjiakou)
 Moguls winners:  Mikaël Kingsbury (m) /  Jaelin Kauf (f)
 Dual Moguls winners:  Mikaël Kingsbury (m) /  Jaelin Kauf (f)
 January 11 & 12: MAWC #3 in  Calgary
 Moguls winners:  Mikaël Kingsbury (m) /  Yuliya Galysheva (f)
 January 17 – 19: MAWC #4 in  Lake Placid
 Moguls winners:  Benjamin Cavet (m) /  Jakara Anthony (f)
 Aerials winners:  Maxim Burov (m) /  Xu Mengtao (f)
 January 26: MAWC #5 in  Mont Tremblant Resort
 Moguls winners:  Mikaël Kingsbury (m) /  Perrine Laffont (f)
 February 16: MAWC #6 in  Moscow
 Aerials winners:  Stanislav Nikitin (m) /  Aliaksandra Ramanouskaya (f)
 February 23: MAWC #7 in  Minsk
 Aerials winners:  Maxim Burov (m) /  Xu Mengtao (f)
 February 23 & 24: MAWC #8 in  Tazawako
 Moguls winners:  Mikaël Kingsbury (m) /  Perrine Laffont (f)
 Dual Moguls winners:  Mikaël Kingsbury (m) /  Perrine Laffont (f)
 March 2 & 3: MAWC #9 (co-final) in  Shymbulak
 Note: The men's and women's dual moguls events here were cancelled.
 Moguls winners:  Ikuma Horishima (m) /  Yuliya Galysheva (f)
 March 2 & 3: MAWC #10 (co-final) in  Shimao Lotus Mountain
 Men's Aerials winner:  Sun Jiaxu (2 times)
 Women's Aerials winners:  Laura Peel (#1) /  Xu Mengtao (#2)
 Team Aerials winners:  China

Half-pipe, Big air, and Slopestyle
 Note: For the FIS page about these events, click here.
 September 5 – 7, 2018: HB&SWC #1 in  Cardrona Alpine Resort
 Big Air winners:  Andri Ragettli (m) /  Elena Gaskell (f)
 November 4, 2018: HB&SWC #2 in  Modena SKIPASS
 Big Air winners:  Birk Ruud (m) /  Mathilde Gremaud (f)
 November 22 – 24, 2018: HB&SWC #3 in  Stubai Alps
 Slopestyle winners:  Henrik Harlaut (m) /  Kelly Sildaru (f)
 December 5 & 7, 2018: HB&SWC #4 in  Copper Mountain
 Halfpipe winners:  Aaron Blunck (m) /  Kelly Sildaru (f)
 December 20 – 22, 2018: HB&SWC #5 in  Genting Resort Secret Garden (Chongli District. Zhangjiakou)
 Halfpipe winners:  Simon d'Artois (m) /  Zhang Kexin (f)
 January 10 – 12: HB&SWC #6 in  Font-Romeu
 Slopestyle winners:  Alex Hall (m) /  Sarah Höfflin (f)
 January 25 – 27: HB&SWC #7 in  Seiser Alm
 Slopestyle winners:  Max Moffatt (m) /  Eileen Gu (f)
 February 14 – 16: HB&SWC #8 in  Calgary
 Halfpipe winners:  David Wise (m) /  Cassie Sharpe (f)
 March 6 – 9: HB&SWC #9 in  Mammoth Mountain Ski Area
 Halfpipe winners:  Birk Irving (m) /  Cassie Sharpe (f)
 Slopestyle winners:  Mac Forehand (m) /  Mathilde Gremaud (f)
 March 14 – 17: HB&SWC #10 in  Quebec City
 Note: The slopestyle events here was cancelled.
 Big Air winners:  Lukas Müllauer (m) /  Mathilde Gremaud (f)
 March 20 & 21: HB&SWC #11 in  Tignes
 Event cancelled.
 March 23: HB&SWC #12 in  Oslo
 Event cancelled.
 March 29 & 30: HB&SWC #13 (final) in  Silvaplana
 Slopestyle winners:  Andri Ragettli (m) /  Megan Oldham (f)

Ski cross
 Note: For the FIS page about these events, click here.
 December 6 – 8, 2018: SCWC #1 in  Val Thorens
 Event cancelled.
 December 13 – 15, 2018: SCWC #2 in  Montafon
 Event cancelled.
 December 16 & 17, 2018: SCWC #3 in  Arosa
 Ski Cross winners:  Jonas Lenherr (m) /  Fanny Smith (f)
 December 20 – 22, 2018: SCWC #4 in  Innichen
 Men's Ski Cross winners:  Jonathan Midol (#1) /  Joos Berry (#2)
 Women's Ski Cross winners:  Fanny Smith (#1) /  Sandra Näslund (#2)
 January 18 – 20: SCWC #5 in  Idre
 Men's Ski Cross winners:  Alex Fiva (#1) /  Jean-Frédéric Chapuis (#2)
 Women's Ski Cross winners:  Heidi Zacher (#1) /  Fanny Smith (#2)
 January 25 & 26: SCWC #6 in  Blue Mountain
 Ski Cross winners:  Brady Leman (m) /  Fanny Smith (f)
 February 15 – 17: SCWC #7 in  Feldberg
 Men's Ski Cross winners:  Ryan Regez (#1) /  Jean-Frédéric Chapuis (#2)
 Women's Ski Cross winner:  Sandra Näslund (2 times)
 February 22 – 24: SCWC #8 in  Sunny Valley Ski Resort (Miass)
 Men's Ski Cross winner:  Bastien Midol (2 times)
 Women's Ski Cross winner:  Fanny Smith (2 times)
 March 17: SCWC #9 (final) in  Veysonnaz
 Ski Cross winners:  Jean-Frédéric Chapuis (m) /  Marielle Thompson (f)

2018–19 FIS Freestyle Skiing Europa Cup
 Note: For the FIS page about these events, click here.
 November 2018
 November 24 & 25, 2018: FSEC #1 in  Pitztal
 Ski Cross winners:  Jonas Lenherr (m) /  Marielle Thompson (f)
 November 30 & December 1, 2018: FSEC #2 in  Ruka
 Men's Aerials winners:  Noé Roth (#1) /  Dimitri Isler (#2)
 Women's Aerials winners:  Iori Usui (#1) /  Laura Peel (#2)
 January 2019
 January 11: FSEC #3 in  Villars-sur-Ollon
 Ski Cross winners:  Romain Detraz (m) /  Fanny Smith (f)
 January 16 & 17: FSEC #4 in  Kreischberg
 Slopestyle winners:  Hannes Rudigier (m) /  Maialen Oiartzabal (f; default)
 Big Air winners:  Kuura Koivisto (m) /  Maialen Oiartzabal (f; default)
 January 17 – 19: FSEC #5 in  Val Thorens
 Men's Ski Cross winners:  Youri Duplessis Kergomard (#1) /  Gil Martin (#2)
 Women's Ski Cross winner:  Amelie Schneider (2 times)
 January 20 – 23: FSEC #6 in  Vars
 Slopestyle winners:  Nils Rhyner (m) /  Lou Barin (f)
 January 24 – 26: FSEC #7 in  Lenk im Simmental
 Men's Ski Cross winner:  Niki Lehikoinen (2 times)
 Women's Ski Cross winner:  Katrin Ofner (2 times)
 January 26 & 27: FSEC #8 in  Moscow
 Men's Aerials winners:  Ilya Harelik (#1) /  Ruslan Katmanov (#2)
 Women's Aerials winner:  Sniazhana Drabiankova (2 times)
 January 26 & 27: FSEC #9 in  St Anton am Arlberg
 Slopestyle winners:  Simo Peltola (m) /  Ruzena Cermakova (f; default)
 Big Air winners:  Matej Svancer (m) /  Ruzena Cermakova (f; default)
 January 26 & 27: FSEC #8 in  Krasnoe Ozero
 Event cancelled.
 January 31 – February 2: FSEC #11 in  Saint François Longchamp
 Note: The second ski cross events for men and women here were cancelled.
 Ski Cross winners:  Youri Duplessis Kergomard (m) /  Amelie Schneider (f)
 February 2019
 February 1 & 2: FSEC #12 in  Taivalvaara
 Moguls winners:  Viacheslav Tcvetkov (m) /  Anna Gerasimova (f)
 Dual moguls winners:  Maxim Kudryavtsev (m) /  Anna Gerasimova (f)
 February 5 & 6: FSEC #13 in  Jyväskylä
 Moguls winners:  Miska Mustonen (m) /  Lulu Shaffer (f)
 Dual moguls winners:  Johannes Suikkari (m) /  Anna Gerasimova (f)
 February 5 – 7: FSEC #14 in  La Clusaz
 Slopestyle winners:  Kuura Koivisto (m) /  Lou Barin (f)
 February 9 & 10: FSEC #15 in  Grasgehren
 Note: The second ski cross events for men and women were cancelled.
 Ski Cross winners:  Florian Wilmsmann (m) /  Heidi Zacher (f)
 February 9 & 10: FSEC #16 in  Bygdsiljum
 Moguls winners:  Johannes Suikkari (m) /  Fantine Degroote (f)
 Dual moguls winners:  Albin Holmgren (m) /  My Bjerkman (f)
 February 15 – 17: FSEC #17 in  Minsk
 Men's Aerials winners:  Ihar Drabiankou (#1) /  Makar Mitrafanau (#2)
 Women's Aerials winner:  Sniazhana Drabiankova (2 times)
 Team Aerials winners: 
 February 16: FSEC #18 in  Kotelnica Bialczanska
 Big Air winners:  Hannes Rudigier (m) /  Elvira Marie Ros (f)
 February 22 & 23: FSEC #19 in  Davos
 Big Air winners:  Kim Gubser (m) /  Kea Kühnel (f)
 February 23: FSEC #20 in  Deštné v Orlických horách
 Slopestyle winners:  Orest Kovalenko (m) /  Tora Johansen (f)
 March 2019
 March 1: FSEC #21 in  Dolní Morava
 Ski Cross winners:  Ryan Regez (m) /  Ekaterina Maltseva (f)
 March 2 & 3: FSEC #22 in  Krispl
 Event cancelled.
 March 12 & 13: FSEC #23 in  Tignes
 Moguls winners:  Nicolas Degaches (m) /  Josefina Wersen (f)
 Dual Moguls winners:  Nicolas Degaches (m) /  My Bjerkman (f)
 March 15 – 18: FSEC #24 in  Gudauri
 Men's Ski Cross winners:  Igor Omelin (#1) /  Youri Duplessis Kergomard (#2)
 Women's Ski Cross winners:  Ekaterina Maltseva (#1) /  Mikayla Martin (#2)
 March 16 & 17: FSEC #25 in  Jasná
 Slopestyle winners:  Vojtěch Bresky (m) /  Kateryna Kotsar (f)
 March 17 – 19: FSEC #26 in  Airolo #1
 Moguls winners:  Thomas Gerken Schofield (m) /  My Bjerkman (f)
 Men's Dual Moguls winners:  Thomas Gerken Schofield (#1) /  Miska Mustonen (#2)
 Women's Dual Moguls winners:  Thea Wallberg (#1) /  Makayla Gerken Schofield (#2)
 March 21 – 24: FSEC #27 in  Reiteralm
 Men's Ski Cross winners:  Cornel Renn (#1) /  Tobias Müller (#2)
 Women's Ski Cross winner:  India Sherret (2 times)
 March 22 & 23: FSEC #28 in  Goetschen
 Big Air winners:  Simo Peltola (m) /  Tora Johansen (f)
 March 22 – 24: FSEC #29 in  Airolo #2
 Men's Aerials winner:  Noé Roth (2 times)
 Women's Aerials winners:  Sniazhana Drabiankova (#1) /  Volha Chromova (#2)
 Team Aerials winners: 
 March 25 & 26: FSEC #30 in  Livigno
 Men's Slopestyle winners:  Kim Gubser (#1) /  Matej Svancer (#2)
 Women's Slopestyle winners:  Kirsty Muir (#1) /  Elisa Maria Nakab (#2)
 March 31 & April 1: FSEC #31 (final) in  Chiesa in Valmalenco
 Men's Aerials winner:  Noé Roth (2 times)
 Women's Aerials winners:  Sniazhana Drabiankova (#1) /  Karyl Loeb (#2)

2018–19 FIS Freestyle Skiing Nor-Am Cup
 Note: For the FIS page about these events, click here.
 December 2018
 December 14 & 15, 2018: FSNA #1 in  Copper Mountain
 Men's Halfpipe winners:  Cassidy Jarrell (#1) /  Sam McKeown (#2)
 Women's Halfpipe winner:  Zoe Atkin (2 times)
 January 2019
 January 5 & 6: FSNA #2 in  Utah Olympic Park
 Men's Aerials winners:  Jonathon Lillis (#1) /  Christopher Lillis (#2)
 Women's Aerials winners:  Olga Polyuk (#1) /  Madison Varmette (#2)
 January 17 & 18: FSNA #3 in  Waterville Valley Resort
 Men's Slopestyle winners:  Deven Fagan (#1) /  Hunter Henderson (#2)
 Women's Slopestyle winners:  Marin Hamill (#1) /  Skye Clarke (#2)
 January 17 – 20: FSNA #4 in  Calabogie Peaks #1
 Men's Ski Cross winners:  Gavin Rowell (#1) /  Jared Schmidt (#2)
 Women's Ski Cross winner:  Zoe Chore (2 times)
 January 27 – 29: FSNA #5 in  Lake Placid
 Note: The second aerials events for men and women were cancelled.
 Aerials winners:  Noé Roth (m) /  Brittany George (f)
 February 2019
 February 1 & 2: FSNA #6 in  Calabogie Peaks #2
 Men's Ski Cross winner:  Jared Schmidt (2 times)
 Women's Ski Cross winner:  Zoe Chore (2 times)
 February 1 & 2: FSNA #7 in  Le Relais #1
 Men's Aerials winners:  Miha Fontaine (#1) /  Quinn Dehlinger (#2)
 Women's Aerials winner:  Megan Smallhouse (2 times)
 February 2 & 3: FSNA #8 in  Stratton Mountain Resort
 Moguls winners:  George McQuinn (m) /  Kasey Hogg (f)
 Dual moguls winners:  Sō Matsuda (m) /  Kenzie Radway (f)
 February 8 – 10: FSNA #9 in  Calgary
 Halfpipe winners:  Hunter Hess (m) /  Svea Irving (f)
 Slopestyle winners:  Étienne Geoffroy Gagnon (m) /  Marin Hamill (f)
 February 9 & 10: FSNA #10 in  Val Saint-Côme
 Moguls winners:  Alex Lewis (m) /  Ali Kariotis (f)
 Dual moguls winners:  Gabriel Dufresne (m) /  Florence Delsame (f)
 February 14 – 16: FSNA #11 in  Aspen/Snowmass
 Note: The women's big air event here was cancelled.
 Slopestyle winners:  Rylan Evans (m) /  Megan Oldham (f)
 Men's Big Air winner:  Ryan Stevenson
 Halfpipe winners:  Samson Schuiling (m) /  Zoe Atkin (f)
 February 18 – 23: FSNA #12 in  Ski Cooper
 Men's Ski Cross winners:  Gavin Rowell (#1) /  Carson Cook (#2)
 Women's Ski Cross winners:  Zoe Chore (#1) /  Hannah Schmidt (#2)
 February 21 – 24: FSNA #13 in  Steamboat Ski Resort
 Moguls winners:  Jack Kariotis (m) /  Kai Owens (f)
 Dual moguls winners:  Elliot Vaillancourt (m) /  Kenzie Radway (f)
 March & April 2019
 March 2 & 3: FSNA #14 in  Apex Mountain Resort
 Moguls winners:  Nick Page (m) /  Shunka Fukushima (f)
 Dual moguls winners:  Sō Matsuda (m) /  Kai Owens (f)
 March 12 – 17: FSNA #15 in  Holiday Valley
 Men's Ski Cross winner:  Phillip Tremblay (2 times)
 Women's Ski Cross winners: (#1) / (#2)
 March 16 & 17: FSNA #16 in  Mammoth Mountain Ski Area
 Halfpipe winners:  Dylan Ladd (m) /  Svea Irving (f)
 Slopestyle winners:  Hunter Henderson (m) /  Marin Hamill (f)
 March 26: FSNA #17 in  Stoneham Mountain Resort
 Halfpipe winners:  Jaxin Hoerter (m) /  Svea Irving (f)
 March 29 & 30: FSNA #18 in  Le Relais #2
 Slopestyle winners:  Hunter Henderson (m) /  Amy Fraser (f)
 April 13 & 14: FSNA #19 (final) in  Banff Sunshine
 Men's Ski Cross winners:  Reece Howden (#1) /  Brady Leman (#2)
 Women's Ski Cross winner:  Kelsey Serwa (2 times)

2018 FIS Freestyle Skiing South American Cup
 Note: For the FIS page about these events, click here.
 August 3 – 5: SAC #1 in  La Parva #1
 Note: The second Women's slopestyle event was cancelled.
 Men's Slopestyle winner:  Mateo Bonacalza (2 times)
 Women's Slopestyle winner:  Dominique Ohaco
 August 10 – 12: SAC #2 in  La Parva #2
 Men's Ski Cross winner:  Joaquin Valdes (2 times)
 Women's Ski Cross winner:  Saga Goni (2 times)
 September 14 & 15: SAC #3 in  Cerro Catedral
 Men's Big Air winner:  Luke Price (2 times)
 Women's Big Air winners:  Abril Melisa Bertzky (#1) /  Josefina Vitiello (#2)
 September 18 – 20: SAC #4 (final) in  Cerro Castor
 Big Air winners:  Luke Price (m) /  Josefina Vitiello (f)
 Slopestyle winners:  Ivan Kuray (m) /  Josefina Vitiello (f)

2018 FIS Freestyle Skiing Australia & New Zealand Cup
 Note: For the FIS page about these events, click here.
 August 14 – 16: ANCFS #1 in  Cardrona Alpine Resort
 Slopestyle winners:  Taisei Yamamoto (m) /  Eileen Gu (f)
 Half-pipe winners:  Sam Ward (m) /  Zoe Atkin (f)
 August 15 – 18: ANCFS #2 in  Falls Creek
 Men's Ski Cross winner:  Oliver Davies (2 times)
 Women's Ski Cross winner:  Sami Kennedy-Sim (2 times)
 August 28 & 29: ANCFS #3 in  Perisher Ski Resort
 Men's Moguls winners:  Mikaël Kingsbury (#1) /  Ikuma Horishima (#2)
 Women's Moguls winner:  Junko Hoshino (#1) /  Jakara Anthony (#2)
 September 1: ANCFS #4 in  Mount Buller Alpine Resort
 Dual Moguls winners:  James Matheson (m) /  Jakara Anthony (f)
 September 3 – 6: ANCFS #5 (final) in  Mount Hotham
 Men's Ski Cross winners:  Douglas Crawford (#1) /  Robbie Morrison (#2)
 Women's Ski Cross winner:  Sami Kennedy-Sim (2 times)

Nordic combined

International nordic combined events
 January 19 – 27: Part of the 2019 Nordic Junior World Ski Championships in  Lahti
 Men's individual winners:  Julian Schmid (#1) /  Johannes Lamparter (#2)
 Women's individual winner:  Ayane Miyazaki
 Men's team winners:  (Luis Lehnert, Simon Huettel, David Mach, & Julian Schmid)
 February 20 – March 3: Part of the FIS Nordic World Ski Championships 2019 in  Seefeld
 Men's individual winners:  Eric Frenzel (#1) /  Jarl Magnus Riiber (#2)
 Men's team winners:  (Espen Bjørnstad, Jan Schmid, Jørgen Graabak, & Jarl Magnus Riiber)
 Men's team sprint winners:  (Eric Frenzel & Fabian Rießle)

2018–19 FIS Nordic Combined World Cup
 Note: For the FIS page about these events, click here.
 November 23 – 25, 2018: NCWC #1 in  Ruka
 Men's individual winner:  Mario Seidl
 Men's team winners:  (Eric Frenzel, Fabian Rießle, Johannes Rydzek, & Vinzenz Geiger)
 November 29 – December 2, 2018: NCWC #2 in  Lillehammer
 Men's individual winner:  Jarl Magnus Riiber (2 times)
 Men's Mass Start winner:  Jarl Magnus Riiber
 December 21 – 23, 2018: NCWC #3 in  Ramsau am Dachstein
 Men's individual winners:  Jarl Magnus Riiber (#1) /  Jørgen Graabak (#2)
 January 4 – 6: NCWC #4 in  Otepää
 Men's individual winner:  Jarl Magnus Riiber (2 times)
 January 10 – 13: NCWC #5 in  Fiemme Valley
 Men's individual winners:  Johannes Rydzek (#1) /  Vinzenz Geiger (#2)
 Men's team winners:  (Jan Schmid & Jørgen Graabak)
 January 17 – 20: NCWC #6 in  Chaux-Neuve
 Men's individual winners:  Franz-Josef Rehrl (#1; 2 times) /  Mario Seidl (#2)
 January 25 – 27: NCWC #7 in  Trondheim
 Men's individual winner:  Jarl Magnus Riiber (2 times)
 February 1 – 3: NCWC #8 in  Klingenthal
 Men's individual winner:  Jarl Magnus Riiber (2 times)
 February 8 – 10: NCWC #9 in  Lahti
 Men's individual winner:  Jørgen Graabak
 Men's team winners:  (Ilkka Herola & Eero Hirvonen)
 March 8 & 9: NCWC #10 in  Oslo
 Men's individual winner:  Jarl Magnus Riiber
 March 15 – 17: NCWC #11 (final) in  Schonach im Schwarzwald
 Men's individual winners:  Bernhard Gruber (#1) /  Jarl Magnus Riiber (#2)

2018–19 FIS Nordic Combined Continental Cup
 Note: For the FIS page about these events, click here.
 December 14 & 15, 2018: CCNC #1 in  Steamboat Ski Resort
 Men's individual winners:  Taylor Fletcher (#1) /  Paul Gerstgraser (#2)
 Women's individual winner:  Tara Geraghty-Moats (2 times)
 December 19 & 20, 2018: CCNC #2 in  Utah Olympic Park
 Men's individual winners:  Lukas Runggaldier (#1) /  Taylor Fletcher (#2)
 Women's individual winners:  Tara Geraghty-Moats (#1) /  Gyda Westvold Hansen (#2)
 January 4 – 6: CCNC #3 in  Klingenthal
 Note: The men's team event here was cancelled.
 Men's individual winner:  Jens Lurås Oftebro (2 times)
 January 5 & 6: CCNC #4 in  Otepää
 Women's individual winner:  Tara Geraghty-Moats (2 times)
 January 11 – 13: CCNC #5 in  Ruka
 Men's individual winner:  Leif Torbjoern Naesvold
 Men's team winners:  (Simen Tiller, Sindre Ure Soetvik, Harald Johnas Riiber, & Leif Torbjoern Naesvold)
 Men's Mass Start winner:  Leif Torbjoern Naesvold
 January 26 & 27: CCNC #6 in  Planica
 Men's individual winners:  Leif Torbjoern Naesvold (#1) /  Paul Gerstgraser (#2)
 February 8 – 10: CCNC #7 in  Eisenerz
 Men's individual winners:  Paul Gerstgraser (2 times)
 Men's team winners:  (Philipp Orter, Christian Deuschl, Florian Dagn, & Paul Gerstgraser)
 February 16 & 17: CCNC #8 in  Rena
 Men's individual winner:  Paul Gerstgraser (2 times)
 Women's individual winner:  Tara Geraghty-Moats (2 times)
 March 8 – 10: CCNC #9 (final) in  Nizhny Tagil
 Men's individual winners:  Luis Lehnert (#1) /  Thomas Joebstl (#2)
 Women's individual winner:  Tara Geraghty-Moats (2 times)
 Mass Start winners:  Thomas Joebstl (m) /  Tara Geraghty-Moats (f)

2018–19 FIS Nordic Combined Alpen Cup
 Note: For the FIS page about these events, click here.
 August 6, 2018: ACNC #1 in  Klingenthal
 Women's individual winner:  Daniela Dejori
 August 10, 2018: ACNC #2 in  Bischofsgrün
 Women's individual winner:  Lisa Hirner
 September 8 – 10, 2018: ACNC #3 in  Winterberg
 Men's individual winners:  Rok Jelen (#1) /  Manuel Einkemmer (#2)
 October 5 – 7, 2018: ACNC #4 in  Fiemme Valley-Predazzo
 Men's individual winners:  David Mach (#1) /  Johannes Lamparter (#2)
 Women's individual winners:  Jenny Nowak (#1) /  Lisa Hirner (#2)
 December 21 – 23, 2018: ACNC #5 in  Villach
 Men's individual winners:  Luis Lehnert (#1) /  Thomas Rettenegger (#2)
 Women's individual winner:  Lisa Hirner (2 times)
 January 12 & 13: ACNC #6 in  Schonach im Schwarzwald
 Men's individual winners:  Edgar Vallet (#1) /  Max Teeling (#2)
 Women's individual winners:  Ema Volavsek (#1) /  Annika Sieff (#2)
 February 8 – 10: ACNC #7 in  Kandersteg
 Men's individual winners:  Severin Reiter (#1) /  Nicolas Pfandl (#2)
 Men's team winners: 
 Women's individual winners:  Cindy Haasch (#1) /  Lisa Hirner (#2)
 Women's team winners: 
 February 16 & 17: ACNC #8 in  Kranj
 Men's individual winners:  Vid Vrhovnik (#1) /  Christian Frank (#2)
 March 9 & 10: ACNC #9 (final) in  Chaux-Neuve
 Men's individual winners:  Max Teeling (#1) /  Rok Jelen (#2)
 Women's individual winners:  Daniela Dejori (#1) /  Annika Sieff (#2)

2018 FIS Nordic Combined Grand Prix
 Note: For the FIS page about these events, click here.
 August 17 – 19: GPNC #1 in  Oberwiesenthal
 Men's individual winner:  Johannes Rydzek
 Men's team winners:  (Franz-Josef Rehrl & Mario Seidl)
 Women's individual winners:  Stefaniya Nadymova (#1) /  Tara Geraghty-Moats (#2)
 August 21 & 22: GPNC #2 in  Villach
 Men's individual winner:  Ilkka Herola
 August 23 – 25: GPNC #3 in  Oberstdorf
 Men's individual winners:  Vinzenz Geiger (#1) /  Akito Watabe (#2)
 September 21 – 23: GPNC #4 (final) in  Planica
 Men's individual winner:  Mario Seidl (2 times)

Nordic skiing
 January 19 – 27: 2019 Nordic Junior World Ski Championships in  Lahti
  won the gold medal tally.  won the overall medal tally.
 February 19 – March 3: FIS Nordic World Ski Championships 2019 in  Seefeld
  won both the gold and overall medal tallies.

Ski jumping

International ski jumping events
 January 19 – 27: Part of the 2019 Nordic Junior World Ski Championships in  Lahti
 Individual winners:  Thomas Aasen Markeng (m) /  Anna Shpyneva (f)
 Men's team winners:  (Luca Roth, Kilian Maerkl, Philipp Raimund, & Constantin Schmid)
 Women's team winners:  (Mariia Iakovleva, Aleksandra Barantceva, Anna Shpyneva, & Lidiia Iakovleva)
 Mixed team winners:  (Anna Shpyneva, Mikhail Purtov, Lidiia Iakovleva, & Maksim Sergeev)
 February 20 – March 3: Part of the FIS Nordic World Ski Championships 2019 in  Seefeld
 Men's individual winners:  Markus Eisenbichler (#1) /  Dawid Kubacki (#2)
 Men's team winners:  (Karl Geiger, Richard Freitag, Stephan Leyhe, & Markus Eisenbichler)
 Women's individual winner:  Maren Lundby
 Women's team winners:  (Juliane Seyfarth, Ramona Straub, Carina Vogt, & Katharina Althaus)
 Mixed team winners:  (Katharina Althaus, Markus Eisenbichler, Juliane Seyfarth, & Karl Geiger)

2018–19 Four Hills Tournament
 December 29 & 30, 2018: FHT #1 in  Oberstdorf
 Men's individual winner:  Ryoyu Kobayashi
 December 31, 2018 & January 1, 2019: FHT #2 in  Garmisch-Partenkirchen
 Men's individual winner:  Ryoyu Kobayashi
 January 3 & 4: FHT #3 in  Innsbruck
 Men's individual winner:  Ryoyu Kobayashi
 January 5 & 6: FHT #4 (final) in  Bischofshofen
 Men's individual winner:  Ryoyu Kobayashi

Raw Air 2019
 March 8 – 10: RA #1 in  Oslo (SJWC #20)
 Individual winners:  Robert Johansson (m) /  Daniela Iraschko-Stolz (f)
 Men's team winners:  (Johann André Forfang, Robin Pedersen, Marius Lindvik, & Robert Johansson)
 March 11 & 12: RA #2 in  Lillehammer (SJWC #21)
 Individual winners:  Stefan Kraft (m) /  Maren Lundby (f)
 March 13 & 14: RA #3 in  Trondheim (SJWC #22)
 Individual winners:  Ryoyu Kobayashi (m) /  Maren Lundby (f)
 March 15 – 17: RA #4 (final) in  Vikersund (SJWC #23)
 Men's individual winner:  Domen Prevc
 Men's team winners:  (Anže Semenič, Peter Prevc, Domen Prevc, & Timi Zajc)

2018–19 FIS Ski Jumping World Cup
 Note: For the FIS page about these events, click here.
 November 16 – 18, 2018: SJWC #1 in  Wisła
 Men's individual winner:  Evgeni Klimov
 Men's team winners:  (Piotr Żyła, Jakub Wolny, Dawid Kubacki, & Kamil Stoch)
 November 23 – 25, 2018: SJWC #2 in  Ruka
 Men's individual winner:  Ryoyu Kobayashi (2 times)
 November 29 – December 2, 2018: SJWC #3 in  Lillehammer
 Women's individual winners:  Juliane Seyfarth (#1) /  Lidiia Iakovleva (#2) /  Katharina Althaus (#3)
 November 30 – December 2, 2018: SJWC #4 in  Nizhny Tagil #1
 Men's individual winners:  Johann André Forfang (#1) /  Ryoyu Kobayashi (#2)
 December 7 – 9, 2018: SJWC #5 in  Titisee-Neustadt
 Event cancelled.
 December 14 – 16, 2018: SJWC #6 in  Engelberg
 Men's individual winners:  Karl Geiger (#1) /  Ryoyu Kobayashi (#2)
 December 14 – 16: SJWC #7 in  Prémanon
 Women's individual winner:  Katharina Althaus (2 times)
 January 11 – 13: SJWC #8 in  Sapporo #1
 Women's individual winners:  Daniela Iraschko-Stolz (#1) /  Maren Lundby (#2)
 January 11 – 13: SJWC #9 in  Fiemme Valley
 Men's individual winners:  Ryoyu Kobayashi (#1) /  Dawid Kubacki (#2)
 January 17 – 20: SJWC #10 in  Zaō, Miyagi
 Women's individual winners:  Daniela Iraschko-Stolz (#1) /  Maren Lundby (#2)
 Women's team winners:  (Juliane Seyfarth, Ramona Straub, Carina Vogt, & Katharina Althaus)
 January 18 – 20: SJWC #11 in  Zakopane
 Men's individual winner:  Stefan Kraft
 Men's team winners:  (Karl Geiger, Markus Eisenbichler, David Siegel, & Stephan Leyhe)
 January 25 – 27: SJWC #12 in  Râșnov
 Women's individual winner:  Maren Lundby (2 times)
 January 25 – 27: SJWC #13 in  Sapporo #2
 Men's individual winner:  Stefan Kraft (2 times)
 February 1 – 3: SJWC #14 in  Oberstdorf #1
 Men's individual winners:  Timi Zajc (#1) /  Ryoyu Kobayashi (#2) /  Kamil Stoch (#3)
 February 1 – 3: SJWC #15 in  Hinzenbach
 Women's individual winner:  Maren Lundby (2 times)
 February 7 – 10: SJWC #16 in  Ljubno ob Savinji
 Note: The second women's event here was cancelled.
 Women's individual winner:  Maren Lundby
 Women's team winners:  (Carina Vogt, Anna Rupprecht, Juliane Seyfarth, & Katharina Althaus)
 February 8 – 10: SJWC #17 in  Lahti
 Men's individual winner:  Kamil Stoch
 Men's team winners:  (Philipp Aschenwald, Gregor Schlierenzauer, Michael Hayböck, & Stefan Kraft)
 February 15 – 17: SJWC #18 in  Willingen
 Men's individual winners:  Karl Geiger (#1) /  Ryoyu Kobayashi (#2)
 Men's team winners:  (Piotr Żyła, Jakub Wolny, Dawid Kubacki, & Kamil Stoch)
 February 15 – 17: SJWC #19 in  Oberstdorf #2
 Women's individual winner:  Maren Lundby (2 times)
 March 15 – 17: SJWC #24 in  Nizhny Tagil #2
 Women's individual winner:  Juliane Seyfarth (2 times)
 March 21 – 24: SJWC #25 in  Planica
 Men's individual winners:  Markus Eisenbichler (#1) /  Ryoyu Kobayashi (#2)
 Men's team winners:  (Jakub Wolny, Kamil Stoch, Dawid Kubacki, & Piotr Żyła)
 March 22 – 24: SJWC #26 (final) in  Chaykovsky, Perm Krai
 Women's individual winners:  Juliane Seyfarth (#1) /  Maren Lundby (#2)

2018–19 FIS Ski Jumping Continental Cup
 Note: For the FIS page about these events, click here.
 July 7 & 8: SJCC #1 in  Kranj
 Men's individual winner:  Killian Peier (2 times) 
 August 16 – 19: SJCC #2 in  Frenštát pod Radhoštěm
 Men's individual winner:  Lukáš Hlava
 August 17: SJCC #3 in  Szczyrk
 Men's individual winner:  Philipp Aschenwald
 August 18: SJCC #4 in  Wisła
 Men's individual winner:  Philipp Aschenwald
 September 8 & 9: SJCC #5 in  Stams
 Men's individual winners:  Philipp Aschenwald (#1) /  Killian Peier (#2)
 September 15 & 16: SJCC #6 in  Oslo
 Men's individual winner:  Philipp Aschenwald (2 times)
 Women's individual winner:  Katharina Althaus (2 times)
 September 22 & 23: SJCC #7 in  Zakopane #1
 Men's individual winners:  Stefan Huber (#1) /  Philipp Aschenwald (#2)
 September 29 & 30: SJCC #8 in  Klingenthal #1
 Men's individual winners:  Dimitry Vassiliev (#1) /  Aleksander Zniszczoł (#2)
 December 8 & 9: SJCC #9 in  Lillehammer
 Men's individual winner:  Marius Lindvik (2 times)
 December 14 & 15: SJCC #10 in  Notodden
 Women's individual winners:  Selina Freitag (#1) /  Claudia Purker (#2)
 December 15 & 16: SJCC #11 in  Ruka
 Men's individual winner:  Robin Pedersen (2 times)
 December 27 & 28: SJCC #12 in  Engelberg
 Men's individual winners:  Markus Schiffner (#1) /  Philipp Aschenwald (#2)
 January 5 & 6: SJCC #13 in  Klingenthal #2
 Men's individual winners:  Moritz Baer (#1) /  Tilen Bartol (#2)
 January 12 & 13: SJCC #14 in  Bischofshofen
 Men's individual winners:  Clemens Aigner (#1) /  Žiga Jelar (#2)
 January 18 – 20: SJCC #15 in  Sapporo Okurayama
 Men's individual winner:  Clemens Aigner (3 times)
 January 19 & 20: SJCC #16 in  Planica #1
 Women's individual winner:  Jerneja Brecl (2 times)
 January 26 & 27: SJCC #17 in  Planica #2
 Men's individual winners:  Bor Pavlovčič (#1) /  Martin Hamann (#2)
 February 1 & 2: SJCC #18 in  Erzurum
 Event cancelled.
 February 8 – 10: SJCC #19 in  Iron Mountain
 Men's individual winners:  Pius Paschke (#1) /  Marius Lindvik (#2) /  Thomas Aasen Markeng (#3)
 February 15 & 16: SJCC #20 in  Oberstdorf
 Men's individual winner:  Clemens Aigner (2 times)
 February 23 & 24: SJCC #21 in  Brotterode
 Men's individual winners:  Clemens Aigner (#1) /  Marius Lindvik (#2)
 Women's individual winners:  Pauline Heßler (#1) /  Katra Komar (#2)
 March 2 & 3, 2019: SJCC #22 in  Rena
 Men's individual winner:  Marius Lindvik (2 times)
 March 16 & 17: SJCC #23 in  Zakopane #2
 Men's individual winners:  Stefan Huber (#1) /  Aleksander Zniszczoł (#2)
 March 23 & 24: SJCC #24 (final) in  Chaykovsky
 Men's individual winner:  Aleksander Zniszczoł (2 times)

2018–19 FIS Ski Jumping Alpen Cup
 Note: For the FIS page about these events, click here.
 August 5 & 6: SJAC #1 in  Klingenthal
 Women's individual winners:  Lisa Hirner (#1) /  Josephin Laue (#2)
 August 8 & 9: SJAC #2 in  Pöhla
 Women's individual winners:  Lisa Hirner (#1) /  Alina Ihle (#2)
 August 10 & 11: SJAC #3 in  Bischofsgrün
 Women's individual winners:  Lisa Hirner (#1) /  Oceane Paillard (#2)
 September 8 & 9: SJSC #4 in  Einsiedeln
 Men's individual winner:  David Haagen (2 times)
 October 5 – 7: SJSC #5 in  Fiemme Valley-Predazzo
 Men's individual winners:  David Haagen (#1) /  Jan Bombek (#2) 
 Women's individual winners:  Lara Malsiner (#1) /  Agnes Reisch (#2)
 December 21 – 23: SJSC #6 in  Villach
 Men's individual winners:  Stefan Rainer (#1) /  Luca Roth (#2)
 Women's individual winners:  Lisa Eder (#1) /  Lisa Hirner (#2)
 January 11 & 12: SJSC #7 in  Schonach im Schwarzwald
 Women's individual winner:  Josephine Pagnier (2 times)
 January 12 & 13: SJSC #8 in  Oberwiesenthal
 Event cancelled.
 February 8 – 10: SJSC #9 in  Kandersteg
 Men's individual winners:  Rok Masle (#1) /  Marco Woergoetter (#2)
 Men's team winners: 
 Women's individual winners:  Ana Jereb (#1) /  Lisa Hirner (#2)
 Women's team winners: 
 February 15 & 16: SJSC #10 in  Kranj
 Men's individual winner:  Aljaž Osterc (2 times)
 February 23 & 24: SJSC #11 in  Oberhof
 Men's individual winners:  Dominik Peter (#1) /  Claudio Moerth (#2)
 March 9 & 10: SJSC #12 (final) in  Chaux-Neuve
 Note: The second women's individual event here was cancelled.
 Men's individual winners:  Dominik Peter (#1) /  David Haagen (#2)
 Women's individual winner:  Pia Mazi

2018 FIS Ski Jumping Grand Prix
 Note: For the FIS page about these events, click here.
 July 20 – 22: SJGP #1 in  Wisła
 Men's individual winner:  Kamil Stoch
 Men's team winners:  (Maciej Kot, Dawid Kubacki, Kamil Stoch, & Piotr Żyła)
 July 27 & 28: SJGP #2 in  Hinterzarten
 Individual winners:  Kamil Stoch (m) /  Sara Takanashi (f)
 August 3 & 4: SJGP #3 in  Einsiedeln
 Men's individual winner:  Kamil Stoch
 August 9 – 11: SJGP #4 in  Courchevel
 Individual winners:  Evgeni Klimov (m) /  Sara Takanashi (f)
 August 16 – 19: SJGP #5 in  Frenštát pod Radhoštěm
 Women's individual winner:  Sara Takanashi (2 times)
 August 23 – 25: SJGP #6 in  Hakuba
 Men's individual winner:  Ryoyu Kobayashi (2 times)
 September 7 – 9: SJGP #7 in  Chaykovsky, Perm Krai
 Note: The men's individual event was cancelled.
 Women's individual winner:  Ema Klinec
 Mixed Team winners:  (Nozomi Maruyama, Yukiya Sato, Sara Takanashi, & Junshirō Kobayashi)
 September 21 – 23: SJGP #8 in  Râșnov
 Men's individual winner:  Karl Geiger (2 times)
 September 27 & 28: SJGP #9 in  Liberec
 Event cancelled.
 September 29 & 30: SJGP #10 in  Hinzenbach
 Men's individual winner:  Daniel Huber
 October 2 & 3: SJGP #11 (final) in  Klingenthal
 Note: The men's individual event was cancelled.
 Women's individual winner:  Anna Rupprecht

2018 FIS Ski Jumping Cup
 Note: For the FIS page about these events, click here.
 July 7 & 8: SJC #1 in  Villach #1 
 Men's winners:  Justin Nietzel (#1) /  Luca Egloff (#2)
 Women's winner:  Chiara Hoelzl (2 times)
 July 14 & 15: SJC #2 in  Szczyrk
 Men's winners:  Maximilian Steiner (#1) /  Justin Nietzel (#2)
 Women's winner:  Daniela Haralambie (2 times)
 August 18 & 19: SJC #3 in  Sochi
 Event cancelled.
 September 15 & 16: SJC #4 in  Râșnov
 Men's winner:  Ren Nikaido (2 times)
 Women's winner:  Daniela Haralambie (2 times)
 December 14 & 15: SJC #5 in  Notodden
 Men's winners:  Stefan Rainer (#1) /  Fabian Seidl (#2)
 December 19 & 20: SJC #6 in  Utah Olympic Park
 Men's winner:  Luca Egloff (2 times)
 Women's winners:  Natalie Eilers (#1) /  Taylor Henrich (#2)
 January 12 & 13: SJC #7 in  Zakopane
 Men's winners:  Claudio Moerth (#1) /  David Haagen (#2)
 January 19 & 20: SJC #8 in  Planica
 Men's winner:  Cene Prevc (2 times)
 January 30 & 31: SJC #9 in  Erzurum
 Event cancelled.
 February 9 & 10: SJC #10 in  Rastbuechl
 Men's winner:  Andreas Wank (2 times)
 Women's winner:  Agnes Reisch (2 times)
 February 23 & 24: SJC #11 (final) in  Villach #2
 Men's winner:  Andreas Wank (2 times)
 Women's winners:  Giada Tomaselli (#1) /  Veronica Gianmoena (#2)

Other ski jumping events
 July 26, 2018: 2018 FIS Europa-Park FIS Youth Cup in  Hinterzarten
 Winners:  Rok Masle (m) /  Ana Jereb (f)
 September 14, 2018: 2018 FIS Carpath Cup in  Râșnov
 Winners:  Andrew Urlaub (m) /  Annika Sieff (f)
 March 7 – 10: 2019 Miyasama Ski Games in both  Okurayama Ski Jump Stadium & Miyanomori Ski Jump Stadium (Sapporo)
 Miyanomori Winners:  Keiichi Sato (m) /  Misaki Shigeno (f)
 Okurayama Winners:  Yumu Harada (m) /  Misaki Shigeno (f)

Snowboarding

Freestyle Ski and Snowboarding World Championships
 August 24 – September 6, 2018: Part of the FIS Junior Freestyle Ski & Snowboard World Championships 2018 in  Cardrona Alpine Resort
 Note: The team snowboard cross events here were cancelled.
 Big Air winners:  Takeru Otsuka (m) /  Kokomo Murase (f)
 Snowboard Cross winners:  Jake Vedder (m) /  Kristina Paul (f)
 Slopestyle winners:  Takeru Otsuka (m) /  Kokomo Murase (f)
 Halfpipe winners:  Toby Miller (m) /  Mitsuki Ono (f)
 Parallel Giant Slalom winners:  Dmitry Loginov (m) /  Milena Bykova (f)
 Parallel Slalom winners:  Dmitry Loginov (m) /  Daniela Ulbing (f)
 January 26 – April 14: FIS Junior Freestyle Ski & Snowboard World Championships 2019 in  Leysin,  Rogla Ski Resort,  Reiteralm, &  Klaeppen
 Leysin (January 26 & 27)
 Halfpipe winners:  Ruka Hirano (m) /  Mitsuki Ono (f)
 Rogla (March 29 – April 5)
 Parallel Giant Slalom winners:  Dmitry Loginov (m) /  Anastasia Kurochkina (f)
 Parallel Slalom winners:  Mykhailo Kharuk (m) /  Maria Valova (f)
 Team Parallel winners:  (Anastasia Kurochkina & Dmitry Loginov)
 Reiteralm (April 1 – 3)
 Snowboard Cross winners:  Loan Bozzolo (m) /  Jana Fischer (f)
 Team Snowboard Cross winners:  (Chloe Passerat & Loan Bozzolo)
 Klaeppen (April 4 – 14)
 Slopestyle winners:  William Buffey (m) /  Sommer Gendron (f)
 Big Air winners:  Ryoma Kimata (m) /  Sommer Gendron (f)
 February 1 – 10: Part of the FIS Freestyle Ski and Snowboarding World Championships 2019 in  Park City, Deer Valley, & Solitude Mountain Resort
 Note: The big air events here were cancelled.
 Halfpipe winners:  Scotty James (m) /  Chloe Kim (f)
 Slopestyle winners:  Chris Corning (m) /  Zoi Sadowski-Synnott (f)
 Snowboard Cross winners:  Mick Dierdorff (m) /  Eva Samková (f)
 Team Snowboard Cross winners:  (Mick Dierdorff & Lindsey Jacobellis)
 Parallel Giant Slalom winners:  Dmitry Loginov (m) /  Selina Jörg (f)
 Parallel Slalom winners:  Dmitry Loginov (m) /  Julie Zogg (f)

Alpine snowboarding
 Note: For the FIS page about these events, click here.
 December 13, 2018: ASWC #1 in  Carezza
 Parallel Giant Slalom winners:  Tim Mastnak (m) /  Nadya Ochner (f)
 December 14 & 15, 2018: ASWC #2 in  Cortina d'Ampezzo
 Parallel Giant Slalom winners:  Roland Fischnaller (m) /  Ester Ledecká (f)
 January 8 & 9: ASWC #3 in  Bad Gastein
 Parallel Slalom winners:  Stefan Baumeister (m) /  Claudia Riegler (f)
 Team Parallel Slalom winners:  (Benjamin Karl & Daniela Ulbing) 
 January 19: ASWC #4 in  Rogla Ski Resort
 Parallel Giant Slalom winners:  Edwin Coratti (m) /  Selina Jörg (f)
 January 26 & 27: ASWC #5 in  Moscow
 Parallel Slalom winners:  Andrey Sobolev (m) /  Julie Zogg (f)
 Team Parallel Slalom winners:  (Daniela Ulbing & Benjamin Karl)
 February 16 & 17: ASWC #6 in  PyeongChang
 Men's Parallel Giant Slalom winners:  Žan Košir (#1) /  Andreas Prommegger (#2)
 Women's Parallel Giant Slalom winners:  Ester Ledecká (#1) /  Ramona Theresia Hofmeister (#2)
 February 23 & 24: ASWC #7 in  Genting Resort Secret Garden
 Parallel Giant Slalom winners:  Tim Mastnak (m) /  Ramona Theresia Hofmeister (f)
 Parallel Slalom winners:  Daniele Bagozza (m) /  Gong Naiying (f)
 March 9: ASWC #8 in  Scuol
 Parallel Giant Slalom winners:  Andrey Sobolev (m) /  Milena Bykova (f)
 March 23 & 24: ASWC #9 (final) in  Winterberg
 Parallel Slalom winners:  Lukas Mathies (m) /  Patrizia Kummer (f)
 Team Parallel Slalom winners:  (Daniela Ulbing & Benjamin Karl)

Snowboard cross
 Note: For the FIS page about these events, click here.
 December 12 – 16, 2018: SBXWC #1 in  Montafon
 Event cancelled.
 December 20 – 22, 2018: SBXWC #2 in  Breuil-Cervinia
 Men's Snowboard Cross winners:  Martin Nörl (#1) /  Emanuel Perathoner (#2)
 Women's Snowboard Cross winners:  Lindsey Jacobellis (#1) /  Eva Samková (#2)
 February 8 – 10: SBXWC #3 in  Feldberg
 Note: The team snowboard cross event here was cancelled.
 Snowboard Cross winners:  Cameron Bolton (m) /  Lindsey Jacobellis (f)
 March 1 & 2: SBXWC #4 in  Baqueira-Beret
 Snowboard Cross winners:  Alessandro Hämmerle (m) /  Eva Samková (f)
 March 16: SBXWC #5 (final) in  Veysonnaz
 Snowboard Cross winners:  Lucas Eguibar (m) /  Eva Samková (f)

Freestyle snowboarding
 Note: For the FIS page about these events, click here.
 September 6 & 8, 2018: FSWC #1 in  Cardrona Alpine Resort
 Big Air winners:  Chris Corning (m) /  Reira Iwabuchi (f)
 November 3, 2018: FSWC #2 in  Modena Skipass
 Big Air winners:  Takeru Otsuka (m) /  Reira Iwabuchi (f)
 November 23 & 24, 2018: FSWC #3 in  Beijing
 Big Air winners:  Sven Thorgren (m) /  Anna Gasser (f)
 December 6 & 8, 2018: FSWC #4 in  Copper Mountain
 Halfpipe winners:  Scotty James (m) /  Chloe Kim (f)
 December 19 – 21, 2018: FSWC #5 in  Genting Resort Secret Garden
 Halfpipe winners:  Jan Scherrer (m) /  Cai Xuetong (f)
 Slopestyle winners:  Takeru Otsuka (m) /  Miyabi Onitsuka (f)
 January 11 & 12: FSWC #6 in  Kreischberg
 Slopestyle winners:  Mons Røisland (m) /  Miyabi Onitsuka (f)
 January 15 – 19: FSWC #7 in  Laax
 Slopestyle winners:  Chris Corning (m) /  Silje Norendal (f)
 Halfpipe winners:  Scotty James (m) /  Chloe Kim (f)
 January 24 & 26: FSWC #8 in  Seiser Alm
 Slopestyle winners:  Markus Olimstad (m) /  Isabel Derungs (f)
 February 13 & 15: FSWC #9 in  Calgary
 Halfpipe winners:  Yūto Totsuka (m) /  Queralt Castellet (f)
 March 5 – 9: FSWC #10 in  Mammoth Mountain
 Note: The women's slopestyle event here was cancelled.
 Men's Slopestyle winner:  Red Gerard
 Halfpipe winners:  Yūto Totsuka (m) /  Cai Xuetong (f)
 March 14 – 17: FSWC #11 (final) in  Quebec City
 Note: The slopestyle events here was cancelled.
 Big Air winners:  Seppe Smits (m) /  Julia Marino (f)
 March 22: FSWC #12 (final) in  Oslo
 Event cancelled.

2018–19 FIS Snowboard Europa Cup
 Note: For the FIS page about these events, click here.
 November 2018
 November 21 & 22, 2018: SBEC #1 in  Landgraaf
 Slopestyle winners:  Erik Bastiaansen (m) /  Melissa Peperkamp (f)
 November 24 & 25, 2018: SBEC #2 in  Kaunertal
 Event cancelled.
 November 28 & 29, 2018: SBEC #3 in  Pitztal
 Men's Snowboard Cross winners:  Konstantin Schad (#1) /  Lucas Eguibar (#2)
 Women's Snowboard Cross winners:  Charlotte Bankes (#1) /  Eva Samková (#2)
 December 2018
 December 22 & 23, 2018: SBEC #4 in  Hochfügen
 Men's Parallel Giant Slalom winners:  Maurizio Bormolini (#1) /  Arvid Auner (#2)
 Women's Parallel Giant Slalom winners:  Ramona Theresia Hofmeister (#1) /  Jemima Juritz (#2)
 January 2019
 January 8 & 9: SBEC #5 in  Jasná
 Event cancelled.
 January 10 & 11: SBEC #6 in  Bad Gastein
 Men's Parallel Slalom winners:  Lee Sang-ho (#1) /  Dmitriy Karlagachev (#2)
 Women's Parallel Slalom winners:  Patrizia Kummer (#1) /  Maria Valova (#2)
 January 12 & 13: SBEC #7 in  Puy-Saint-Vincent
 Men's Snowboard Cross winners:  Lorenzo Sommariva (#1) /  Florian Gregor (#2)
 Women's Snowboard Cross winner:  Charlotte Bankes (2 times)
 January 16 & 17: SBEC #8 in  Kreischberg
 Big Air winners:  Boris Mouton (m) /  Melissa Peperkamp (f)
 Slopestyle winners:  Moritz Boll (m) /  Melissa Peperkamp (f)
 January 19 & 20: SBEC #9 in  Grasgehren
 Men's Snowboard Cross winners:  Jakob Dusek (#1) /  Kalle Koblet (#2)
 Women's Snowboard Cross winner:  Lara Casanova (2 times)
 January 22 & 23: SBEC #10 in  Font-Romeu
 Note: The slopestyle events here were cancelled.
 Big Air winners:  Moritz Boll (m) /  Lucie Silvestre (f)
 January 25 & 26: SBEC #11 in  Vars
 Slopestyle winners:  Moritz Boll (m) /  Lucie Silvestre (f)
 Big Air winners:  Leon Guetl (m) /  Noemie Equy (f)
 January 26 & 27: SBEC #12 in  Lachtal
 Men's Parallel Giant Slalom winners:  Igor Sluev (#1) /  Ilia Vitugov (#2)
 Women's Parallel Giant Slalom winners:  Jessica Keiser (#1) /  Sofia Nadyrshina (#2)
 January 29 & 30: SBEC #13 in  Val Thorens
 Note: The second snowboard cross events for men and women were cancelled.
 Snowboard Cross winners:  Florian Gregor (m) /  Katharina Neussner (f)
 January 31 & February 1: SBEC #14 in  Monte Bondone
 Event cancelled.
 February 2019
 February 2 & 3: SBEC #15 in  Sarajevo
 Men's Big Air winners:  Matija Milenković (#1) /  Tino Stojak (#2)
 Women's Big Air winner:  Martyna Maciejewska (2 times)
 February 6 & 7: SBEC #16 in  Dolní Morava
 Men's Snowboard Cross winners:  David Pickl (#1) /  Sebastian Jud (#2)
 Women's Snowboard Cross winners:  Chloe Passerat (#1) /  Katharina Neussner (#2)
 February 7 & 8: SBEC #17 in  Kopaonik
 Men's Big Air winners:  Tino Stojak (#1) /  Noah Vicktor (#2)
 Women's Big Air winners:  Jelena Ignjatov (#1) /  Tinkara Tanja Valcl (#2)
 February 9 & 10: SBEC #18 in  Lenzerheide
 Men's Parallel Slalom winner:  Fabian Obmann (2 times)
 Women's Parallel Slalom winner:  Anastasia Kurochkina (2 times)
 February 9 & 10: SBEC #19 in  Crans-Montana
 Halfpipe winners:  Lorenzo Gennero (m) /  Berenice Wicki (f)
 February 15 & 16: SBEC #20 in  Kotelnica Bialczanska
 Big Air winners:  Tino Stojak (m) /  Martyna Maciejewska (f)
 February 22 & 23: SBEC #21 in  Davos #1
 Big Air winners:  Nick Puenter (m) /  Lia-Mara Boesch (f)
 February 26 & 27: SBEC #22 in  Götschen
 Men's Big Air winners:  Gabriel Adams (#1) /  Tino Stojak (#2)
 Women's Big Air winners:  Nadja Flemming (#1) /  Emma Lantos (#2)
 March 2019
 March 2 & 3: SBEC #23 in  Davos #2
 Men's Parallel Giant Slalom & Parallel Slalom winner:  Masaki Shiba
 Women's Parallel Giant Slalom & Parallel Slalom winner:  Patrizia Kummer
 March 8 – 10: SBEC #24 in  Gudauri
 Men's Snowboard Cross winners:  Jakob Dusek (#1) /  Merlin Surget (#2)
 Women's Snowboard Cross winner:  Hanna Ihedioha (2 times)
 March 10 – 16: SBEC #25 in  Sunny Valley (Miass)
 Men's Snowboard Cross winners:  Jakob Dusek (#1) /  Loan Bozzolo (#2)
 Women's Snowboard Cross winners:  Jana Fischer (#1) /  Sophie Hediger (#2)
 March 15 – 17: SBEC #26 in  Kühtai Saddle
 Big Air winners:  Jules de Sloover (m) /  Evy Poppe (f)
 Halfpipe winners:  Christoph Lechner (m) /  Leilani Ettel (f)
 March 16: SBEC #27 in  Pec pod Sněžkou
 Slopestyle winners:  Leon Guetl (m) /  Šárka Pančochová (f)
 March 16 & 17: SBEC #28 in  Rogla Ski Resort
 Men's Parallel Giant Slalom winner:  Tim Mastnak (2 times)
 Women's Parallel Giant Slalom winners:  Elizaveta Salikhova (#1) /  Anastasia Kurochkina (#2)
 March 18 & 19: SBEC #29 in  Jasná
 Men's Slopestyle winners:  Noah Vicktor (#1) /  Leon Guetl (#2)
 Women's Slopestyle winner:  Lucie Silvestre (2 times)
 March 21 – 24: SBEC #30 in  Laax
 Slopestyle winners:  Noah Vicktor (m) /  Bianca Gisler (f)
 Halfpipe winners:  Andre Hoeflich (m) /  Verena Rohrer (f)
 March 22 – 24: SBEC #31 in  Lenk
 Men's Snowboard Cross winner:  Loan Bozzolo (2 times)
 Women's Snowboard Cross winner:  Chloé Trespeuch (2 times)
 March 26 – 28: SBEC #32 in  Sochi
 Slopestyle winners:  Mark Teimurov (m) /  Ekaterina Kosova (f)
 Big Air winners:  Mikhail Matveev (m) /  Ekaterina Kosova (f)
 March 28 & 29: SBEC #33 in  Livigno
 Men's Slopestyle winner:  Jonas Bösiger (2 times)
 Women's Slopestyle winner:  Loranne Smans (2 times)
 April 2019
 April 6 & 7: SBEC #34 in  Racines
 Men's Parallel Slalom winners:  Arvid Auner (#1) /  Stefan Baumeister (#2)
 Women's Parallel Slalom winners:  Tsubaki Miki (#1) /  Jemima Juritz (#2)
 April 10 – 14: SBEC #35 (final) in  Silvaplana
 Note: The men's slopestyle event here was cancelled.
 Women's Slopestyle winner:  Isabel Derungs
 Big Air winners:  Jonas Bösiger (m) /  Carla Somaini (f)

2018–19 FIS Snowboard Nor-Am Cup
 Note: For the FIS page about these events, click here.
 December 8 & 9, 2018: SNAC #1 in  Steamboat Ski Resort
 Parallel Giant Slalom winners:  Robert Burns (m) /  Tsubaki Miki (f)
 Parallel Slalom winners:  Robert Burns (m) /  Maggie Carrigan (f)
 December 11 & 12, 2018: SNAC #2 in  Copper Mountain
 Men's Halfpipe winner:  Yūto Totsuka (2 times)
 Women's Halfpipe winners:  Kurumi Imai (#1) /  Hikaru Ōe (#2)
 December 14 – 16, 2018: SNAC #3 in  Buck Hill
 Men's Parallel Slalom winners:  Cody Winters (#1; 2 times) /  Robert Burns (#2)
 Women's Parallel Slalom winners:  Tsubaki Miki (#1) /  Kaylie Buck (#2; 2 times)
 January 2 – 4: SNAC #4 in  Le Relais
 Men's Parallel Giant Slalom winners:  Jasey-Jay Anderson (#1) /  Ryan Rosencranz (#2)
 Women's Parallel Giant Slalom winners:  Kaylie Buck (#1) /  Lynn Ott (#2)
 January 7 – 9: SNAC #5 in  Panorama Mountain Village
 Men's Snowboard Cross winners:  Glenn de Blois (#1) /  Hagen Kearney (#2)
 Women's Snowboard Cross winners:  Tess Critchlow (#1) /  Carle Brenneman (#2)
 January 14 & 15: SNAC #6 in  Waterville Valley Resort
 Men's Slopestyle winners:  Jake Canter (#1) /  Luke Winkelmann (#2)
 Women's Slopestyle winners:  Addison Gardner (#1) /  Courtney Rummel (#2)
 January 22 – 24: SNAC #7 in  Sun Peaks Resort
 Slopestyle winners:  Luke Winkelmann (m) /  Addison Gardner (f)
 Big Air winners:  Storm Rowe (m) /  Jade Thurgood (f)
 February 6 – 8: SNAC #8 in  Craigleith Ski Club
 Men's Snowboard Cross winners:  Cole Johnson (#1) /  Mike Lacroix (#2)
 Women's Snowboard Cross winners:  Christina Taylor (#1) /  Emma Downing (#2)
 February 6 – 8: SNAC #9 in  Mount St. Louis Moonstone
 Note: The big air events here were cancelled.
 Slopestyle winners:  Storm Rowe (m) /  Addison Gardner (f)
 February 9 & 10: SNAC #10 in  Alpine Ski Club
 Men's Parallel Slalom winner:  Arnaud Gaudet (2 times)
 Women's Parallel Slalom winner:  Kaylie Buck (2 times)
 February 11 – 13: SNAC #11 in  Mont Orignal
 Men's Snowboard Cross winners:  Éliot Grondin (#1) /  Liam Moffatt (#2)
 Women's Snowboard Cross winner:  Livia Molodyh (2 times)
 February 18 – 23: SNAC #12 in  Ski Cooper
 Men's Snowboard Cross winners:  Senna Leith (#1) /  WOO Jin (#2)
 Women's Snowboard Cross winners:  Anna Miller (#1) /  Stacy Gaskill (#2)
 February 28 & March 1: SNAC #13 in  Holiday Valley #1
 Men's Parallel Giant Slalom winner:  Arnaud Gaudet (2 times)
 Women's Parallel Giant Slalom winner:  Megan Farrell (2 times)
 March 3 – 8: SNAC #14 in  Blue Mountain
 Parallel Giant Slalom winners:  Sebastien Beaulieu (m) /  Katrina Gerencser (f)
 Parallel Slalom winners:  Jules Lefebvre (m) /  Megan Farrell (f)
 March 12 – 17: SNAC #15 in  Holiday Valley #2
 Men's Snowboard Cross winners:  Liam Moffatt (#1) /  Mike Lacroix (#2)
 Women's Snowboard Cross winner:  Audrey McManiman (2 times)
 March 13 & 14: SNAC #16 in  Mammoth Mountain Ski Area
 Slopestyle winners:  Liam Brearley (m) /  Addison Gardner (f)
 Halfpipe winners:  Shawn Fair (m) /  Brooke Dhondt (f)
 March 18 – 24: SNAC #17 in  Canada Olympic Park (Calgary)
 Halfpipe winners:  Shawn Fair (m) /  Brooke Dhondt (f)
 Men's Slopestyle & Big Air winner:  Nicolas Laframboise 
 Women's Slopestyle & Big Air winner:  Jasmine Baird 
 March 26 – 28: SNAC #18 (final) in  Big White Ski Resort
 Snowboard Cross winners:  Danny Bourgeois (m) /  Tess Critchlow (f)

2018 FIS Snowboard South American Cup
 Note: For the FIS page about these events, click here.
 August 3 – 5: SACSB #1 in  La Parva #1
 Men's Slopestyle winners:  Martin Jaureguialzo (#1) /  Inaqui Irarrazaval (#2)
 Women's Slopestyle winner:  Antonia Yanez (2 times)
 August 10 – 12: SACSB #2 in  La Parva #2
 Note: Both women's snowboard cross events here were cancelled.
 Men's Snowboard Cross winners:  Simon White (#1) /  Steven Williams (#2)
 September 14 & 15: SACSB #3 in  Cerro Catedral
 Men's Big Air winners:  Matías Schmitt (#1) /  Federico Chiaradio de la Iglesia (#2)
 Women's Big Air winner:  Antonia Yanez (2 times)
 September 18 – 23: SACSB #4 & #5 (final) in  Cerro Castor
 Big Air winners:  Federico Chiaradio de la Iglesia (m) /  Maria Azul Chavez Martinez (f)
 Slopestyle winners:  Matías Schmitt (m) /  Morena Poggi Silveira (f)
 Snowboard Cross winners:  Regino Hernández (m) /  Maria Agustina Pardo (f)

2018 FIS Snowboard Australia & New Zealand Cup
 Note: For the FIS page about these events, click here.
 July 30 – August 1: SBANC #1 in  Mount Hotham #1
 Snowboard Cross winners:  Alex Pullin (m) /  Emily Boyce (f)
 August 14 – 16: SBANC #2 in  Cardrona Alpine Resort
 Slopestyle winners:  Ryo Aizawa (m) /  Rina Yoshika (f)
 Half-pipe winners:  Lee Kwang-ki (m) /  LEE Min-ju (f)
 September 3 – 5: SBANC #3 (final) in  Mount Hotham #2
 Note: The third set of snowboard cross events here was cancelled.
 Men's Snowboard Cross winners:  Paul Berg (#1) /  Alex Pullin (#2)
 Women's Snowboard Cross winner:  Emily Boyce (2 times)

Telemark skiing

Telemark Skiing World Championships
 February 14 – 18: 2019 Junior Telemark Skiing World Championships in  Krvavec Ski Resort
 Note: The Junior World Championship and the World Cup are separate events, even though they are located in an identical location and dates.
 Classic winners:  Noe Claye (m) /  Chloe Blyth (f)
 Team Parallel Sprint winners:  
 Parallel Sprint winners:  Christoph Frank (m) /  Goril Strom Eriksen (f)
 Sprint winners:  Theo Sillon (m) /  Julie Bourbon (f)
 March 20 – 23: 2019 Telemark Skiing World Championships in  Rjukan
 Classic winners:  Trym Nygaard Loeken (m) /  Amelie Wenger-Reymond (f)
 Sprint winners:  Stefan Matter (m) /  Amelie Wenger-Reymond (f)
 Parallel Sprint winners:  Philippe Lau (m) /  Johanna Holzmann (f)
 Team Parallel Sprint winners:

2019 Telemark Skiing World Cup
 Note: For the FIS page about these events, click here.
 January 20 & 21: TSWC #1 in  La Thuile
 Classic winners:  Trym Nygaard Loeken (m) /  Amelie Wenger-Reymond (f)
 Sprint winners:  Trym Nygaard Loeken (m) /  Argeline Tan Bouquet (f)
 January 25 & 26: TSWC #2 in  Pralognan-la-Vanoise
 Sprint winners:  Philippe Lau (m) /  Jasmin Taylor (f)
 Classic winners:  Stefan Matter (m) /  Amelie Wenger-Reymond (f)
 January 29 – February 1: TSWC #3 in  Pra-Loup
 Classic winners:  Stefan Matter (m) /  Amelie Wenger-Reymond (f)
 Sprint winners:  Bastien Dayer (m) /  Amelie Wenger-Reymond (f)
 Parallel Sprint winners:  Philippe Lau (m) /  Argeline Tan Bouquet (f)
 February 9 & 10: TSWC #4 in  Bad Hindelang-Oberjoch
 Sprint winners:  Bastien Dayer (m) /  Amelie Wenger-Reymond (f)
 Parallel Sprint winners:  Trym Nygaard Loeken (m) /  Amelie Wenger-Reymond (f)
 February 14 – 18: TSWC #5 (final) in  Krvavec Ski Resort
 Classic winners:  Bastien Dayer (m) /  Amelie Wenger-Reymond (f)
 Parallel Sprint winners:  Philippe Lau (m) /  Johanna Holzmann (f)
 Sprint winners:  Stefan Matter (m) /  Amelie Wenger-Reymond (f)

References

External links
 International Ski Federation official website

Skiing by year
Skiing
Skiing
2018 sport-related lists
2019 sport-related lists